

546001–546100 

|-bgcolor=#d6d6d6
| 546001 ||  || — || October 18, 2011 || Kitt Peak || Spacewatch ||  || align=right | 2.6 km || 
|-id=002 bgcolor=#d6d6d6
| 546002 ||  || — || August 30, 2005 || Palomar || NEAT || EOS || align=right | 2.4 km || 
|-id=003 bgcolor=#d6d6d6
| 546003 ||  || — || December 21, 2006 || Mount Lemmon || Mount Lemmon Survey || 7:4 || align=right | 3.5 km || 
|-id=004 bgcolor=#E9E9E9
| 546004 ||  || — || April 7, 2005 || Mount Lemmon || Mount Lemmon Survey ||  || align=right | 2.4 km || 
|-id=005 bgcolor=#d6d6d6
| 546005 ||  || — || October 23, 2005 || Catalina || CSS || EOS || align=right | 2.3 km || 
|-id=006 bgcolor=#fefefe
| 546006 ||  || — || June 5, 2005 || Junk Bond || D. Healy || H || align=right data-sort-value="0.63" | 630 m || 
|-id=007 bgcolor=#d6d6d6
| 546007 ||  || — || November 24, 2011 || Haleakala || Pan-STARRS ||  || align=right | 2.3 km || 
|-id=008 bgcolor=#fefefe
| 546008 ||  || — || February 28, 2009 || Kitt Peak || Spacewatch ||  || align=right data-sort-value="0.57" | 570 m || 
|-id=009 bgcolor=#d6d6d6
| 546009 ||  || — || November 2, 2011 || Charleston || R. Holmes ||  || align=right | 2.4 km || 
|-id=010 bgcolor=#fefefe
| 546010 ||  || — || November 26, 2011 || Haleakala || Pan-STARRS ||  || align=right data-sort-value="0.88" | 880 m || 
|-id=011 bgcolor=#fefefe
| 546011 ||  || — || November 24, 2008 || Mount Lemmon || Mount Lemmon Survey ||  || align=right data-sort-value="0.62" | 620 m || 
|-id=012 bgcolor=#d6d6d6
| 546012 ||  || — || November 17, 2011 || Mount Lemmon || Mount Lemmon Survey ||  || align=right | 3.1 km || 
|-id=013 bgcolor=#d6d6d6
| 546013 ||  || — || December 1, 2006 || Mount Lemmon || Mount Lemmon Survey ||  || align=right | 2.8 km || 
|-id=014 bgcolor=#fefefe
| 546014 ||  || — || October 19, 2011 || Kitt Peak || Spacewatch ||  || align=right data-sort-value="0.58" | 580 m || 
|-id=015 bgcolor=#d6d6d6
| 546015 ||  || — || September 3, 2010 || Mount Lemmon || Mount Lemmon Survey ||  || align=right | 2.3 km || 
|-id=016 bgcolor=#d6d6d6
| 546016 ||  || — || October 26, 2011 || Haleakala || Pan-STARRS ||  || align=right | 2.4 km || 
|-id=017 bgcolor=#d6d6d6
| 546017 ||  || — || March 31, 2008 || Mount Lemmon || Mount Lemmon Survey ||  || align=right | 2.9 km || 
|-id=018 bgcolor=#d6d6d6
| 546018 ||  || — || November 3, 2011 || Catalina || CSS ||  || align=right | 2.6 km || 
|-id=019 bgcolor=#d6d6d6
| 546019 ||  || — || October 26, 2011 || Haleakala || Pan-STARRS ||  || align=right | 1.7 km || 
|-id=020 bgcolor=#fefefe
| 546020 ||  || — || January 31, 2009 || Mount Lemmon || Mount Lemmon Survey ||  || align=right data-sort-value="0.62" | 620 m || 
|-id=021 bgcolor=#fefefe
| 546021 ||  || — || October 23, 2011 || Haleakala || Pan-STARRS ||  || align=right data-sort-value="0.74" | 740 m || 
|-id=022 bgcolor=#d6d6d6
| 546022 ||  || — || November 30, 2011 || Catalina || CSS ||  || align=right | 2.8 km || 
|-id=023 bgcolor=#fefefe
| 546023 ||  || — || January 16, 2009 || Kitt Peak || Spacewatch ||  || align=right data-sort-value="0.57" | 570 m || 
|-id=024 bgcolor=#fefefe
| 546024 ||  || — || May 26, 2009 || Kitt Peak || Spacewatch ||  || align=right data-sort-value="0.91" | 910 m || 
|-id=025 bgcolor=#d6d6d6
| 546025 Ábrahámpéter ||  ||  || November 17, 2011 || Piszkesteto || A. Farkas, K. Sárneczky ||  || align=right | 2.8 km || 
|-id=026 bgcolor=#fefefe
| 546026 ||  || — || November 11, 2004 || Kitt Peak || Kitt Peak Obs. ||  || align=right data-sort-value="0.87" | 870 m || 
|-id=027 bgcolor=#d6d6d6
| 546027 ||  || — || November 23, 2011 || Kitt Peak || Spacewatch ||  || align=right | 3.0 km || 
|-id=028 bgcolor=#d6d6d6
| 546028 ||  || — || October 28, 2011 || Mount Lemmon || Mount Lemmon Survey ||  || align=right | 2.7 km || 
|-id=029 bgcolor=#d6d6d6
| 546029 ||  || — || March 31, 2009 || Mount Lemmon || Mount Lemmon Survey ||  || align=right | 3.5 km || 
|-id=030 bgcolor=#fefefe
| 546030 ||  || — || November 22, 2011 || Mount Lemmon || Mount Lemmon Survey || H || align=right data-sort-value="0.53" | 530 m || 
|-id=031 bgcolor=#d6d6d6
| 546031 ||  || — || November 17, 2011 || Mount Lemmon || Mount Lemmon Survey ||  || align=right | 3.2 km || 
|-id=032 bgcolor=#fefefe
| 546032 ||  || — || November 25, 2011 || Haleakala || Pan-STARRS ||  || align=right data-sort-value="0.81" | 810 m || 
|-id=033 bgcolor=#fefefe
| 546033 ||  || — || March 1, 2009 || Kitt Peak || Spacewatch ||  || align=right data-sort-value="0.57" | 570 m || 
|-id=034 bgcolor=#d6d6d6
| 546034 ||  || — || November 1, 2011 || Catalina || CSS ||  || align=right | 2.2 km || 
|-id=035 bgcolor=#d6d6d6
| 546035 ||  || — || July 30, 2005 || Palomar || NEAT ||  || align=right | 2.8 km || 
|-id=036 bgcolor=#d6d6d6
| 546036 ||  || — || October 29, 2006 || Mount Lemmon || Mount Lemmon Survey ||  || align=right | 3.0 km || 
|-id=037 bgcolor=#d6d6d6
| 546037 ||  || — || October 23, 2011 || Haleakala || Pan-STARRS ||  || align=right | 3.1 km || 
|-id=038 bgcolor=#d6d6d6
| 546038 ||  || — || April 30, 2009 || Mount Lemmon || Mount Lemmon Survey ||  || align=right | 3.7 km || 
|-id=039 bgcolor=#fefefe
| 546039 ||  || — || July 15, 2010 || WISE || WISE ||  || align=right data-sort-value="0.51" | 510 m || 
|-id=040 bgcolor=#fefefe
| 546040 ||  || — || November 24, 2011 || Mount Lemmon || Mount Lemmon Survey ||  || align=right data-sort-value="0.54" | 540 m || 
|-id=041 bgcolor=#d6d6d6
| 546041 ||  || — || November 24, 2011 || Haleakala || Pan-STARRS ||  || align=right | 2.4 km || 
|-id=042 bgcolor=#d6d6d6
| 546042 ||  || — || April 25, 2014 || Mount Lemmon || Mount Lemmon Survey ||  || align=right | 2.1 km || 
|-id=043 bgcolor=#fefefe
| 546043 ||  || — || November 22, 2011 || Mount Lemmon || Mount Lemmon Survey ||  || align=right data-sort-value="0.63" | 630 m || 
|-id=044 bgcolor=#d6d6d6
| 546044 ||  || — || November 18, 2011 || Mount Lemmon || Mount Lemmon Survey ||  || align=right | 2.5 km || 
|-id=045 bgcolor=#fefefe
| 546045 ||  || — || November 18, 2011 || Mount Lemmon || Mount Lemmon Survey ||  || align=right data-sort-value="0.50" | 500 m || 
|-id=046 bgcolor=#d6d6d6
| 546046 ||  || — || January 10, 2007 || Mount Lemmon || Mount Lemmon Survey ||  || align=right | 2.9 km || 
|-id=047 bgcolor=#fefefe
| 546047 ||  || — || August 25, 2003 || Cerro Tololo || Cerro Tololo Obs. ||  || align=right data-sort-value="0.67" | 670 m || 
|-id=048 bgcolor=#fefefe
| 546048 ||  || — || December 6, 2011 || Haleakala || Pan-STARRS ||  || align=right data-sort-value="0.73" | 730 m || 
|-id=049 bgcolor=#fefefe
| 546049 Zhujin ||  ||  || December 23, 2011 || Xingming || G. Sun, X. Gao ||  || align=right data-sort-value="0.79" | 790 m || 
|-id=050 bgcolor=#fefefe
| 546050 ||  || — || September 10, 2007 || Mount Lemmon || Mount Lemmon Survey ||  || align=right data-sort-value="0.64" | 640 m || 
|-id=051 bgcolor=#fefefe
| 546051 ||  || — || October 20, 2007 || Kitt Peak || Spacewatch ||  || align=right data-sort-value="0.67" | 670 m || 
|-id=052 bgcolor=#d6d6d6
| 546052 ||  || — || September 30, 2005 || Mount Lemmon || Mount Lemmon Survey || EOS || align=right | 2.3 km || 
|-id=053 bgcolor=#fefefe
| 546053 ||  || — || December 1, 2011 || Haleakala || Pan-STARRS ||  || align=right data-sort-value="0.69" | 690 m || 
|-id=054 bgcolor=#fefefe
| 546054 ||  || — || December 25, 2011 || Kitt Peak || Spacewatch ||  || align=right data-sort-value="0.76" | 760 m || 
|-id=055 bgcolor=#fefefe
| 546055 ||  || — || December 25, 2011 || Kitt Peak || Spacewatch ||  || align=right data-sort-value="0.73" | 730 m || 
|-id=056 bgcolor=#fefefe
| 546056 ||  || — || November 19, 2007 || Kitt Peak || Spacewatch ||  || align=right data-sort-value="0.67" | 670 m || 
|-id=057 bgcolor=#fefefe
| 546057 ||  || — || October 23, 2003 || Kitt Peak || L. H. Wasserman, D. E. Trilling || MAS || align=right data-sort-value="0.59" | 590 m || 
|-id=058 bgcolor=#fefefe
| 546058 ||  || — || December 25, 2011 || Kitt Peak || Spacewatch ||  || align=right | 1.2 km || 
|-id=059 bgcolor=#d6d6d6
| 546059 ||  || — || December 24, 2011 || Mount Lemmon || Mount Lemmon Survey ||  || align=right | 2.8 km || 
|-id=060 bgcolor=#fefefe
| 546060 ||  || — || December 26, 2011 || Kitt Peak || Spacewatch ||  || align=right data-sort-value="0.61" | 610 m || 
|-id=061 bgcolor=#fefefe
| 546061 ||  || — || April 10, 2005 || Mount Lemmon || Mount Lemmon Survey ||  || align=right data-sort-value="0.70" | 700 m || 
|-id=062 bgcolor=#fefefe
| 546062 ||  || — || November 3, 2007 || Dauban || F. Kugel ||  || align=right | 1.1 km || 
|-id=063 bgcolor=#d6d6d6
| 546063 ||  || — || December 24, 2011 || Mount Lemmon || Mount Lemmon Survey || 7:4 || align=right | 3.1 km || 
|-id=064 bgcolor=#fefefe
| 546064 ||  || — || October 8, 2007 || Mount Lemmon || Mount Lemmon Survey ||  || align=right data-sort-value="0.72" | 720 m || 
|-id=065 bgcolor=#fefefe
| 546065 ||  || — || October 8, 2007 || Kitt Peak || Spacewatch ||  || align=right data-sort-value="0.50" | 500 m || 
|-id=066 bgcolor=#fefefe
| 546066 ||  || — || December 27, 2011 || Kitt Peak || Spacewatch || H || align=right data-sort-value="0.85" | 850 m || 
|-id=067 bgcolor=#fefefe
| 546067 ||  || — || October 21, 2011 || Kitt Peak || Spacewatch ||  || align=right data-sort-value="0.87" | 870 m || 
|-id=068 bgcolor=#fefefe
| 546068 ||  || — || November 28, 2011 || Mount Lemmon || Mount Lemmon Survey ||  || align=right data-sort-value="0.79" | 790 m || 
|-id=069 bgcolor=#d6d6d6
| 546069 ||  || — || June 22, 2004 || Kitt Peak || Spacewatch ||  || align=right | 2.7 km || 
|-id=070 bgcolor=#fefefe
| 546070 ||  || — || March 16, 2005 || Catalina || CSS ||  || align=right | 1.0 km || 
|-id=071 bgcolor=#fefefe
| 546071 ||  || — || March 8, 2005 || Mount Lemmon || Mount Lemmon Survey ||  || align=right data-sort-value="0.74" | 740 m || 
|-id=072 bgcolor=#fefefe
| 546072 ||  || — || December 31, 2011 || Mount Lemmon || Mount Lemmon Survey ||  || align=right data-sort-value="0.68" | 680 m || 
|-id=073 bgcolor=#FA8072
| 546073 ||  || — || December 29, 2011 || Mount Lemmon || Mount Lemmon Survey || H || align=right data-sort-value="0.57" | 570 m || 
|-id=074 bgcolor=#d6d6d6
| 546074 ||  || — || November 24, 2006 || Mount Lemmon || Mount Lemmon Survey ||  || align=right | 2.9 km || 
|-id=075 bgcolor=#d6d6d6
| 546075 ||  || — || April 5, 2014 || Haleakala || Pan-STARRS ||  || align=right | 3.6 km || 
|-id=076 bgcolor=#d6d6d6
| 546076 ||  || — || October 10, 2015 || Mount Lemmon || Mount Lemmon Survey ||  || align=right | 2.9 km || 
|-id=077 bgcolor=#d6d6d6
| 546077 ||  || — || December 24, 2011 || Mount Lemmon || Mount Lemmon Survey ||  || align=right | 2.7 km || 
|-id=078 bgcolor=#d6d6d6
| 546078 ||  || — || September 4, 2010 || Kitt Peak || Spacewatch ||  || align=right | 1.5 km || 
|-id=079 bgcolor=#E9E9E9
| 546079 ||  || — || September 17, 2010 || Kitt Peak || Spacewatch ||  || align=right | 1.3 km || 
|-id=080 bgcolor=#E9E9E9
| 546080 ||  || — || September 18, 2010 || Kitt Peak || Spacewatch ||  || align=right | 1.9 km || 
|-id=081 bgcolor=#fefefe
| 546081 ||  || — || March 10, 2005 || Mount Lemmon || Mount Lemmon Survey ||  || align=right data-sort-value="0.55" | 550 m || 
|-id=082 bgcolor=#fefefe
| 546082 ||  || — || October 2, 2010 || Kitt Peak || Spacewatch ||  || align=right data-sort-value="0.66" | 660 m || 
|-id=083 bgcolor=#d6d6d6
| 546083 ||  || — || October 26, 2005 || Kitt Peak || Spacewatch ||  || align=right | 2.4 km || 
|-id=084 bgcolor=#d6d6d6
| 546084 ||  || — || October 26, 2005 || Kitt Peak || Spacewatch ||  || align=right | 1.7 km || 
|-id=085 bgcolor=#fefefe
| 546085 ||  || — || September 23, 2000 || Socorro || LINEAR ||  || align=right data-sort-value="0.63" | 630 m || 
|-id=086 bgcolor=#d6d6d6
| 546086 ||  || — || October 2, 2010 || Kitt Peak || Spacewatch ||  || align=right | 2.3 km || 
|-id=087 bgcolor=#d6d6d6
| 546087 ||  || — || October 6, 2010 || Mayhill-ISON || L. Elenin ||  || align=right | 3.9 km || 
|-id=088 bgcolor=#d6d6d6
| 546088 ||  || — || September 29, 2005 || Mount Lemmon || Mount Lemmon Survey ||  || align=right | 2.2 km || 
|-id=089 bgcolor=#d6d6d6
| 546089 ||  || — || October 1, 2005 || Kitt Peak || Spacewatch ||  || align=right | 2.1 km || 
|-id=090 bgcolor=#d6d6d6
| 546090 ||  || — || August 30, 2005 || Kitt Peak || Spacewatch ||  || align=right | 2.4 km || 
|-id=091 bgcolor=#fefefe
| 546091 ||  || — || October 8, 2010 || Kitt Peak || Spacewatch ||  || align=right data-sort-value="0.53" | 530 m || 
|-id=092 bgcolor=#d6d6d6
| 546092 ||  || — || February 28, 2008 || Kitt Peak || Spacewatch ||  || align=right | 2.3 km || 
|-id=093 bgcolor=#d6d6d6
| 546093 ||  || — || March 10, 2007 || Kitt Peak || Spacewatch ||  || align=right | 2.5 km || 
|-id=094 bgcolor=#d6d6d6
| 546094 ||  || — || July 17, 2004 || Cerro Tololo || Cerro Tololo Obs. ||  || align=right | 3.2 km || 
|-id=095 bgcolor=#d6d6d6
| 546095 ||  || — || August 29, 2005 || Palomar || NEAT ||  || align=right | 3.7 km || 
|-id=096 bgcolor=#fefefe
| 546096 ||  || — || September 19, 2010 || Kitt Peak || Spacewatch ||  || align=right data-sort-value="0.67" | 670 m || 
|-id=097 bgcolor=#d6d6d6
| 546097 ||  || — || September 11, 2010 || Kitt Peak || Spacewatch ||  || align=right | 2.7 km || 
|-id=098 bgcolor=#d6d6d6
| 546098 ||  || — || October 8, 2010 || Moletai || K. Černis ||  || align=right | 2.6 km || 
|-id=099 bgcolor=#fefefe
| 546099 ||  || — || February 4, 2005 || Kitt Peak || Spacewatch ||  || align=right data-sort-value="0.70" | 700 m || 
|-id=100 bgcolor=#d6d6d6
| 546100 ||  || — || September 27, 2000 || Kitt Peak || Spacewatch ||  || align=right | 3.0 km || 
|}

546101–546200 

|-bgcolor=#fefefe
| 546101 ||  || — || August 23, 2003 || Cerro Tololo || Cerro Tololo Obs. ||  || align=right data-sort-value="0.76" | 760 m || 
|-id=102 bgcolor=#fefefe
| 546102 ||  || — || September 4, 2010 || Kitt Peak || Spacewatch ||  || align=right data-sort-value="0.70" | 700 m || 
|-id=103 bgcolor=#d6d6d6
| 546103 ||  || — || October 9, 2005 || Kitt Peak || Spacewatch ||  || align=right | 1.8 km || 
|-id=104 bgcolor=#fefefe
| 546104 ||  || — || October 8, 2010 || Kitt Peak || Spacewatch ||  || align=right data-sort-value="0.46" | 460 m || 
|-id=105 bgcolor=#d6d6d6
| 546105 ||  || — || August 12, 2004 || Palomar || NEAT ||  || align=right | 4.1 km || 
|-id=106 bgcolor=#fefefe
| 546106 ||  || — || September 30, 2003 || Kitt Peak || Spacewatch ||  || align=right data-sort-value="0.69" | 690 m || 
|-id=107 bgcolor=#d6d6d6
| 546107 ||  || — || October 27, 2005 || Kitt Peak || Spacewatch ||  || align=right | 2.2 km || 
|-id=108 bgcolor=#d6d6d6
| 546108 ||  || — || September 29, 2005 || Mount Lemmon || Mount Lemmon Survey ||  || align=right | 2.2 km || 
|-id=109 bgcolor=#fefefe
| 546109 ||  || — || August 25, 2003 || Cerro Tololo || Cerro Tololo Obs. ||  || align=right data-sort-value="0.70" | 700 m || 
|-id=110 bgcolor=#d6d6d6
| 546110 ||  || — || October 8, 2010 || Charleston || R. Holmes ||  || align=right | 2.8 km || 
|-id=111 bgcolor=#d6d6d6
| 546111 ||  || — || October 8, 2010 || Kitt Peak || Spacewatch ||  || align=right | 2.3 km || 
|-id=112 bgcolor=#d6d6d6
| 546112 ||  || — || October 8, 2010 || Kitt Peak || Spacewatch ||  || align=right | 1.4 km || 
|-id=113 bgcolor=#d6d6d6
| 546113 ||  || — || October 1, 2010 || Mount Lemmon || Mount Lemmon Survey ||  || align=right | 2.6 km || 
|-id=114 bgcolor=#d6d6d6
| 546114 ||  || — || September 17, 2010 || Mount Lemmon || Mount Lemmon Survey ||  || align=right | 1.7 km || 
|-id=115 bgcolor=#d6d6d6
| 546115 ||  || — || August 29, 2005 || Kitt Peak || Spacewatch ||  || align=right | 2.4 km || 
|-id=116 bgcolor=#d6d6d6
| 546116 ||  || — || October 1, 2005 || Kitt Peak || Spacewatch ||  || align=right | 1.6 km || 
|-id=117 bgcolor=#d6d6d6
| 546117 ||  || — || September 15, 2010 || Mount Lemmon || Mount Lemmon Survey ||  || align=right | 1.9 km || 
|-id=118 bgcolor=#d6d6d6
| 546118 ||  || — || October 1, 2010 || Kitt Peak || Spacewatch ||  || align=right | 2.0 km || 
|-id=119 bgcolor=#d6d6d6
| 546119 ||  || — || October 9, 2010 || Kitt Peak || Spacewatch ||  || align=right | 1.9 km || 
|-id=120 bgcolor=#d6d6d6
| 546120 ||  || — || October 2, 2005 || Mount Lemmon || Mount Lemmon Survey ||  || align=right | 1.9 km || 
|-id=121 bgcolor=#d6d6d6
| 546121 ||  || — || October 1, 2010 || Kitt Peak || Spacewatch ||  || align=right | 2.0 km || 
|-id=122 bgcolor=#fefefe
| 546122 ||  || — || September 21, 2003 || Kitt Peak || Spacewatch ||  || align=right data-sort-value="0.82" | 820 m || 
|-id=123 bgcolor=#fefefe
| 546123 ||  || — || October 18, 2003 || Kitt Peak || Spacewatch ||  || align=right data-sort-value="0.85" | 850 m || 
|-id=124 bgcolor=#d6d6d6
| 546124 ||  || — || February 28, 2008 || Kitt Peak || Spacewatch ||  || align=right | 2.6 km || 
|-id=125 bgcolor=#d6d6d6
| 546125 ||  || — || August 6, 2010 || Kitt Peak || Spacewatch ||  || align=right | 2.1 km || 
|-id=126 bgcolor=#fefefe
| 546126 ||  || — || November 2, 2007 || Mount Lemmon || Mount Lemmon Survey ||  || align=right data-sort-value="0.54" | 540 m || 
|-id=127 bgcolor=#fefefe
| 546127 ||  || — || April 2, 2005 || Palomar || NEAT ||  || align=right data-sort-value="0.76" | 760 m || 
|-id=128 bgcolor=#fefefe
| 546128 ||  || — || May 25, 2006 || Mount Lemmon || Mount Lemmon Survey ||  || align=right data-sort-value="0.60" | 600 m || 
|-id=129 bgcolor=#d6d6d6
| 546129 ||  || — || October 27, 2005 || Mount Lemmon || Mount Lemmon Survey ||  || align=right | 1.9 km || 
|-id=130 bgcolor=#d6d6d6
| 546130 ||  || — || October 9, 2010 || Kitt Peak || Spacewatch ||  || align=right | 2.3 km || 
|-id=131 bgcolor=#fefefe
| 546131 ||  || — || October 9, 2010 || Kitt Peak || Spacewatch ||  || align=right data-sort-value="0.53" | 530 m || 
|-id=132 bgcolor=#fefefe
| 546132 ||  || — || October 9, 2010 || Kitt Peak || Spacewatch ||  || align=right data-sort-value="0.50" | 500 m || 
|-id=133 bgcolor=#d6d6d6
| 546133 ||  || — || January 27, 2007 || Mount Lemmon || Mount Lemmon Survey ||  || align=right | 2.4 km || 
|-id=134 bgcolor=#d6d6d6
| 546134 ||  || — || September 4, 2010 || Kitt Peak || Spacewatch ||  || align=right | 2.1 km || 
|-id=135 bgcolor=#fefefe
| 546135 ||  || — || October 9, 2010 || Kitt Peak || Spacewatch ||  || align=right data-sort-value="0.58" | 580 m || 
|-id=136 bgcolor=#fefefe
| 546136 ||  || — || September 16, 2010 || Kitt Peak || Spacewatch ||  || align=right data-sort-value="0.49" | 490 m || 
|-id=137 bgcolor=#fefefe
| 546137 ||  || — || September 16, 2010 || Kitt Peak || Spacewatch ||  || align=right data-sort-value="0.69" | 690 m || 
|-id=138 bgcolor=#d6d6d6
| 546138 ||  || — || April 10, 2003 || Kitt Peak || Spacewatch ||  || align=right | 2.4 km || 
|-id=139 bgcolor=#fefefe
| 546139 ||  || — || October 9, 2010 || Mount Lemmon || Mount Lemmon Survey ||  || align=right data-sort-value="0.56" | 560 m || 
|-id=140 bgcolor=#d6d6d6
| 546140 ||  || — || September 10, 2010 || Kitt Peak || Spacewatch ||  || align=right | 2.4 km || 
|-id=141 bgcolor=#fefefe
| 546141 ||  || — || September 15, 2010 || Mount Lemmon || Mount Lemmon Survey ||  || align=right data-sort-value="0.64" | 640 m || 
|-id=142 bgcolor=#d6d6d6
| 546142 ||  || — || October 30, 2005 || Mount Lemmon || Mount Lemmon Survey ||  || align=right | 2.9 km || 
|-id=143 bgcolor=#d6d6d6
| 546143 ||  || — || October 10, 2010 || Mount Lemmon || Mount Lemmon Survey ||  || align=right | 2.1 km || 
|-id=144 bgcolor=#d6d6d6
| 546144 ||  || — || October 10, 2010 || Mount Lemmon || Mount Lemmon Survey ||  || align=right | 2.5 km || 
|-id=145 bgcolor=#fefefe
| 546145 ||  || — || November 12, 2007 || Mount Lemmon || Mount Lemmon Survey ||  || align=right data-sort-value="0.67" | 670 m || 
|-id=146 bgcolor=#d6d6d6
| 546146 ||  || — || October 10, 2010 || Kitt Peak || Spacewatch ||  || align=right | 2.1 km || 
|-id=147 bgcolor=#fefefe
| 546147 ||  || — || October 1, 2003 || Kitt Peak || Spacewatch ||  || align=right data-sort-value="0.60" | 600 m || 
|-id=148 bgcolor=#d6d6d6
| 546148 ||  || — || February 28, 2008 || Mount Lemmon || Mount Lemmon Survey ||  || align=right | 2.8 km || 
|-id=149 bgcolor=#d6d6d6
| 546149 ||  || — || October 10, 2010 || Kitt Peak || Spacewatch ||  || align=right | 2.7 km || 
|-id=150 bgcolor=#d6d6d6
| 546150 ||  || — || October 28, 2005 || Kitt Peak || Spacewatch ||  || align=right | 1.4 km || 
|-id=151 bgcolor=#fefefe
| 546151 ||  || — || October 1, 2010 || La Sagra || OAM Obs. ||  || align=right data-sort-value="0.52" | 520 m || 
|-id=152 bgcolor=#fefefe
| 546152 ||  || — || October 11, 2010 || Bergisch Gladbach || W. Bickel ||  || align=right data-sort-value="0.73" | 730 m || 
|-id=153 bgcolor=#fefefe
| 546153 ||  || — || December 6, 2007 || Mount Lemmon || Mount Lemmon Survey ||  || align=right data-sort-value="0.53" | 530 m || 
|-id=154 bgcolor=#fefefe
| 546154 ||  || — || March 28, 2009 || Mount Lemmon || Mount Lemmon Survey || (2076) || align=right data-sort-value="0.85" | 850 m || 
|-id=155 bgcolor=#fefefe
| 546155 ||  || — || September 11, 2010 || Kitt Peak || Spacewatch ||  || align=right data-sort-value="0.57" | 570 m || 
|-id=156 bgcolor=#fefefe
| 546156 ||  || — || October 11, 2010 || Mount Lemmon || Mount Lemmon Survey ||  || align=right data-sort-value="0.54" | 540 m || 
|-id=157 bgcolor=#fefefe
| 546157 ||  || — || October 11, 2010 || Mount Lemmon || Mount Lemmon Survey ||  || align=right data-sort-value="0.72" | 720 m || 
|-id=158 bgcolor=#d6d6d6
| 546158 ||  || — || April 3, 2008 || Kitt Peak || Spacewatch ||  || align=right | 2.4 km || 
|-id=159 bgcolor=#fefefe
| 546159 ||  || — || October 11, 2010 || Kitt Peak || Spacewatch ||  || align=right data-sort-value="0.65" | 650 m || 
|-id=160 bgcolor=#d6d6d6
| 546160 ||  || — || September 16, 2010 || Mount Lemmon || Mount Lemmon Survey ||  || align=right | 2.5 km || 
|-id=161 bgcolor=#fefefe
| 546161 ||  || — || October 11, 2010 || Mount Lemmon || Mount Lemmon Survey ||  || align=right data-sort-value="0.66" | 660 m || 
|-id=162 bgcolor=#fefefe
| 546162 ||  || — || September 22, 2003 || Kitt Peak || Spacewatch ||  || align=right data-sort-value="0.52" | 520 m || 
|-id=163 bgcolor=#d6d6d6
| 546163 ||  || — || January 27, 2007 || Mount Lemmon || Mount Lemmon Survey ||  || align=right | 2.1 km || 
|-id=164 bgcolor=#fefefe
| 546164 ||  || — || October 11, 2010 || Mount Lemmon || Mount Lemmon Survey ||  || align=right data-sort-value="0.53" | 530 m || 
|-id=165 bgcolor=#d6d6d6
| 546165 ||  || — || October 11, 2010 || Mount Lemmon || Mount Lemmon Survey ||  || align=right | 2.1 km || 
|-id=166 bgcolor=#d6d6d6
| 546166 ||  || — || February 14, 2007 || Mauna Kea || Q. s. observers ||  || align=right | 2.5 km || 
|-id=167 bgcolor=#d6d6d6
| 546167 ||  || — || September 9, 2004 || Kitt Peak || Spacewatch ||  || align=right | 2.3 km || 
|-id=168 bgcolor=#fefefe
| 546168 ||  || — || October 11, 2010 || Mayhill-ISON || L. Elenin ||  || align=right data-sort-value="0.87" | 870 m || 
|-id=169 bgcolor=#fefefe
| 546169 ||  || — || June 1, 2009 || Mount Lemmon || Mount Lemmon Survey ||  || align=right data-sort-value="0.83" | 830 m || 
|-id=170 bgcolor=#d6d6d6
| 546170 ||  || — || October 11, 2010 || Mount Lemmon || Mount Lemmon Survey ||  || align=right | 2.4 km || 
|-id=171 bgcolor=#fefefe
| 546171 ||  || — || October 12, 1997 || Kitt Peak || Spacewatch ||  || align=right data-sort-value="0.65" | 650 m || 
|-id=172 bgcolor=#fefefe
| 546172 ||  || — || December 3, 2007 || Kitt Peak || Spacewatch ||  || align=right data-sort-value="0.67" | 670 m || 
|-id=173 bgcolor=#fefefe
| 546173 ||  || — || March 2, 2009 || Mount Lemmon || Mount Lemmon Survey ||  || align=right data-sort-value="0.63" | 630 m || 
|-id=174 bgcolor=#d6d6d6
| 546174 ||  || — || September 25, 2005 || Kitt Peak || Spacewatch ||  || align=right | 2.0 km || 
|-id=175 bgcolor=#d6d6d6
| 546175 ||  || — || October 27, 2005 || Kitt Peak || Spacewatch ||  || align=right | 3.4 km || 
|-id=176 bgcolor=#d6d6d6
| 546176 ||  || — || September 18, 2010 || Mount Lemmon || Mount Lemmon Survey ||  || align=right | 3.3 km || 
|-id=177 bgcolor=#fefefe
| 546177 ||  || — || October 10, 2010 || Mount Lemmon || Mount Lemmon Survey ||  || align=right data-sort-value="0.70" | 700 m || 
|-id=178 bgcolor=#d6d6d6
| 546178 ||  || — || September 17, 2010 || Kitt Peak || Spacewatch || EOS || align=right | 1.4 km || 
|-id=179 bgcolor=#fefefe
| 546179 ||  || — || October 14, 2010 || Magdalena Ridge || W. H. Ryan, E. V. Ryan ||  || align=right data-sort-value="0.56" | 560 m || 
|-id=180 bgcolor=#fefefe
| 546180 ||  || — || October 7, 2010 || Catalina || CSS ||  || align=right | 1.2 km || 
|-id=181 bgcolor=#d6d6d6
| 546181 ||  || — || October 13, 2010 || Wildberg || R. Apitzsch ||  || align=right | 3.4 km || 
|-id=182 bgcolor=#fefefe
| 546182 ||  || — || July 6, 2003 || Kitt Peak || Spacewatch ||  || align=right data-sort-value="0.59" | 590 m || 
|-id=183 bgcolor=#fefefe
| 546183 ||  || — || October 13, 2010 || Mount Lemmon || Mount Lemmon Survey ||  || align=right data-sort-value="0.67" | 670 m || 
|-id=184 bgcolor=#d6d6d6
| 546184 ||  || — || March 14, 2007 || Mount Lemmon || Mount Lemmon Survey ||  || align=right | 2.9 km || 
|-id=185 bgcolor=#fefefe
| 546185 ||  || — || October 11, 2010 || Catalina || CSS ||  || align=right data-sort-value="0.88" | 880 m || 
|-id=186 bgcolor=#d6d6d6
| 546186 ||  || — || October 7, 2010 || Andrushivka || P. Kyrylenko, Y. Ivaščenko ||  || align=right | 3.0 km || 
|-id=187 bgcolor=#d6d6d6
| 546187 ||  || — || October 9, 2010 || Catalina || CSS ||  || align=right | 2.8 km || 
|-id=188 bgcolor=#d6d6d6
| 546188 ||  || — || October 11, 2010 || Catalina || CSS ||  || align=right | 2.7 km || 
|-id=189 bgcolor=#E9E9E9
| 546189 ||  || — || October 10, 2010 || Kitt Peak || Spacewatch ||  || align=right data-sort-value="0.76" | 760 m || 
|-id=190 bgcolor=#fefefe
| 546190 ||  || — || March 19, 2009 || Kitt Peak || Spacewatch ||  || align=right data-sort-value="0.72" | 720 m || 
|-id=191 bgcolor=#d6d6d6
| 546191 ||  || — || October 19, 2010 || Mount Lemmon || Mount Lemmon Survey ||  || align=right | 3.1 km || 
|-id=192 bgcolor=#d6d6d6
| 546192 ||  || — || August 15, 2004 || Cerro Tololo || Cerro Tololo Obs. ||  || align=right | 3.2 km || 
|-id=193 bgcolor=#fefefe
| 546193 ||  || — || September 18, 2003 || Kitt Peak || Spacewatch ||  || align=right data-sort-value="0.66" | 660 m || 
|-id=194 bgcolor=#d6d6d6
| 546194 ||  || — || October 15, 2010 || Mayhill-ISON || L. Elenin || EOS || align=right | 1.8 km || 
|-id=195 bgcolor=#C2FFFF
| 546195 ||  || — || October 27, 2009 || Mount Lemmon || Mount Lemmon Survey || L4 || align=right | 6.2 km || 
|-id=196 bgcolor=#d6d6d6
| 546196 ||  || — || October 14, 2010 || Dauban || C. Rinner, F. Kugel ||  || align=right | 2.9 km || 
|-id=197 bgcolor=#fefefe
| 546197 ||  || — || October 1, 2010 || Catalina || CSS ||  || align=right data-sort-value="0.88" | 880 m || 
|-id=198 bgcolor=#d6d6d6
| 546198 ||  || — || October 2, 2010 || Kitt Peak || Spacewatch ||  || align=right | 2.3 km || 
|-id=199 bgcolor=#fefefe
| 546199 ||  || — || August 8, 2013 || Haleakala || Pan-STARRS ||  || align=right data-sort-value="0.59" | 590 m || 
|-id=200 bgcolor=#d6d6d6
| 546200 ||  || — || October 14, 2010 || Mount Lemmon || Mount Lemmon Survey ||  || align=right | 2.7 km || 
|}

546201–546300 

|-bgcolor=#E9E9E9
| 546201 ||  || — || September 19, 2014 || Haleakala || Pan-STARRS ||  || align=right | 1.2 km || 
|-id=202 bgcolor=#d6d6d6
| 546202 ||  || — || January 10, 2013 || Haleakala || Pan-STARRS || 7:4 || align=right | 2.9 km || 
|-id=203 bgcolor=#fefefe
| 546203 ||  || — || March 13, 2016 || Haleakala || Pan-STARRS ||  || align=right data-sort-value="0.68" | 680 m || 
|-id=204 bgcolor=#d6d6d6
| 546204 ||  || — || October 10, 2010 || Kitt Peak || Spacewatch ||  || align=right | 2.9 km || 
|-id=205 bgcolor=#d6d6d6
| 546205 ||  || — || August 21, 2015 || Haleakala || Pan-STARRS ||  || align=right | 2.1 km || 
|-id=206 bgcolor=#fefefe
| 546206 ||  || — || October 11, 2010 || Mount Lemmon || Mount Lemmon Survey ||  || align=right data-sort-value="0.63" | 630 m || 
|-id=207 bgcolor=#d6d6d6
| 546207 ||  || — || May 5, 2003 || Kitt Peak || Spacewatch ||  || align=right | 2.5 km || 
|-id=208 bgcolor=#d6d6d6
| 546208 ||  || — || October 12, 2010 || Mount Lemmon || Mount Lemmon Survey ||  || align=right | 2.7 km || 
|-id=209 bgcolor=#d6d6d6
| 546209 ||  || — || December 4, 2016 || Mount Lemmon || Mount Lemmon Survey ||  || align=right | 2.3 km || 
|-id=210 bgcolor=#d6d6d6
| 546210 ||  || — || October 14, 2010 || Mount Lemmon || Mount Lemmon Survey ||  || align=right | 2.2 km || 
|-id=211 bgcolor=#d6d6d6
| 546211 ||  || — || May 22, 2014 || Mount Lemmon || Mount Lemmon Survey ||  || align=right | 2.3 km || 
|-id=212 bgcolor=#d6d6d6
| 546212 ||  || — || October 13, 2010 || Mount Lemmon || Mount Lemmon Survey ||  || align=right | 2.5 km || 
|-id=213 bgcolor=#d6d6d6
| 546213 ||  || — || October 15, 2010 || Sandlot || G. Hug ||  || align=right | 2.8 km || 
|-id=214 bgcolor=#d6d6d6
| 546214 ||  || — || October 9, 2010 || Catalina || CSS ||  || align=right | 2.2 km || 
|-id=215 bgcolor=#d6d6d6
| 546215 ||  || — || October 12, 2010 || Mount Lemmon || Mount Lemmon Survey ||  || align=right | 2.4 km || 
|-id=216 bgcolor=#fefefe
| 546216 ||  || — || October 11, 2010 || Catalina || CSS ||  || align=right data-sort-value="0.61" | 610 m || 
|-id=217 bgcolor=#d6d6d6
| 546217 ||  || — || October 9, 2010 || Mount Lemmon || Mount Lemmon Survey ||  || align=right | 2.2 km || 
|-id=218 bgcolor=#C2FFFF
| 546218 ||  || — || October 13, 2010 || Kitt Peak || Spacewatch || L4 || align=right | 6.2 km || 
|-id=219 bgcolor=#d6d6d6
| 546219 ||  || — || October 8, 2010 || Kitt Peak || Spacewatch || 7:4 || align=right | 2.8 km || 
|-id=220 bgcolor=#d6d6d6
| 546220 ||  || — || October 12, 2010 || Mount Lemmon || Mount Lemmon Survey ||  || align=right | 2.0 km || 
|-id=221 bgcolor=#fefefe
| 546221 ||  || — || October 13, 2010 || Mount Lemmon || Mount Lemmon Survey ||  || align=right data-sort-value="0.57" | 570 m || 
|-id=222 bgcolor=#d6d6d6
| 546222 ||  || — || October 25, 2005 || Mount Lemmon || Mount Lemmon Survey ||  || align=right | 2.4 km || 
|-id=223 bgcolor=#d6d6d6
| 546223 ||  || — || September 25, 2009 || Catalina || CSS || Tj (2.99) || align=right | 3.6 km || 
|-id=224 bgcolor=#d6d6d6
| 546224 ||  || — || October 31, 2005 || Mount Lemmon || Mount Lemmon Survey || EOS || align=right | 1.5 km || 
|-id=225 bgcolor=#d6d6d6
| 546225 ||  || — || October 11, 1999 || Kitt Peak || Spacewatch ||  || align=right | 2.9 km || 
|-id=226 bgcolor=#fefefe
| 546226 ||  || — || September 20, 2003 || Palomar || NEAT ||  || align=right data-sort-value="0.77" | 770 m || 
|-id=227 bgcolor=#d6d6d6
| 546227 ||  || — || October 28, 2010 || Mount Lemmon || Mount Lemmon Survey ||  || align=right | 2.7 km || 
|-id=228 bgcolor=#d6d6d6
| 546228 ||  || — || October 14, 2010 || Mount Lemmon || Mount Lemmon Survey ||  || align=right | 2.7 km || 
|-id=229 bgcolor=#d6d6d6
| 546229 ||  || — || October 28, 2010 || Mount Lemmon || Mount Lemmon Survey ||  || align=right | 2.3 km || 
|-id=230 bgcolor=#d6d6d6
| 546230 ||  || — || July 27, 2009 || Kitt Peak || Spacewatch ||  || align=right | 2.9 km || 
|-id=231 bgcolor=#d6d6d6
| 546231 ||  || — || October 28, 2010 || Mount Lemmon || Mount Lemmon Survey ||  || align=right | 3.0 km || 
|-id=232 bgcolor=#d6d6d6
| 546232 ||  || — || October 14, 2010 || Mount Lemmon || Mount Lemmon Survey ||  || align=right | 2.4 km || 
|-id=233 bgcolor=#d6d6d6
| 546233 ||  || — || October 14, 2010 || Mount Lemmon || Mount Lemmon Survey ||  || align=right | 3.0 km || 
|-id=234 bgcolor=#fefefe
| 546234 ||  || — || September 20, 2003 || Palomar || NEAT ||  || align=right data-sort-value="0.68" | 680 m || 
|-id=235 bgcolor=#fefefe
| 546235 ||  || — || October 28, 2010 || Piszkesteto || Z. Kuli, K. Sárneczky ||  || align=right | 1.0 km || 
|-id=236 bgcolor=#d6d6d6
| 546236 ||  || — || September 11, 2010 || Mount Lemmon || Mount Lemmon Survey ||  || align=right | 2.1 km || 
|-id=237 bgcolor=#d6d6d6
| 546237 ||  || — || October 11, 2010 || Mount Lemmon || Mount Lemmon Survey ||  || align=right | 2.0 km || 
|-id=238 bgcolor=#d6d6d6
| 546238 ||  || — || October 13, 2010 || Mount Lemmon || Mount Lemmon Survey ||  || align=right | 2.5 km || 
|-id=239 bgcolor=#d6d6d6
| 546239 ||  || — || February 23, 2007 || Kitt Peak || Spacewatch ||  || align=right | 2.4 km || 
|-id=240 bgcolor=#fefefe
| 546240 ||  || — || November 20, 2003 || Kitt Peak || Spacewatch ||  || align=right data-sort-value="0.74" | 740 m || 
|-id=241 bgcolor=#fefefe
| 546241 ||  || — || October 29, 2010 || Mount Lemmon || Mount Lemmon Survey ||  || align=right data-sort-value="0.56" | 560 m || 
|-id=242 bgcolor=#C2FFFF
| 546242 ||  || — || October 29, 2010 || Mount Lemmon || Mount Lemmon Survey || L4 || align=right | 9.8 km || 
|-id=243 bgcolor=#d6d6d6
| 546243 ||  || — || August 15, 2004 || Cerro Tololo || Cerro Tololo Obs. ||  || align=right | 3.1 km || 
|-id=244 bgcolor=#d6d6d6
| 546244 ||  || — || September 18, 2010 || Mount Lemmon || Mount Lemmon Survey ||  || align=right | 2.4 km || 
|-id=245 bgcolor=#fefefe
| 546245 ||  || — || September 19, 2003 || Kitt Peak || Spacewatch ||  || align=right data-sort-value="0.64" | 640 m || 
|-id=246 bgcolor=#d6d6d6
| 546246 ||  || — || February 26, 2007 || Mount Lemmon || Mount Lemmon Survey ||  || align=right | 3.0 km || 
|-id=247 bgcolor=#d6d6d6
| 546247 ||  || — || October 9, 2010 || Mount Lemmon || Mount Lemmon Survey ||  || align=right | 2.2 km || 
|-id=248 bgcolor=#d6d6d6
| 546248 ||  || — || October 11, 2010 || Kitt Peak || Spacewatch ||  || align=right | 2.4 km || 
|-id=249 bgcolor=#d6d6d6
| 546249 ||  || — || October 9, 2010 || Bergisch Gladbach || W. Bickel ||  || align=right | 2.0 km || 
|-id=250 bgcolor=#d6d6d6
| 546250 ||  || — || October 30, 2010 || Mount Lemmon || Mount Lemmon Survey ||  || align=right | 2.1 km || 
|-id=251 bgcolor=#d6d6d6
| 546251 ||  || — || September 16, 2010 || Mount Lemmon || Mount Lemmon Survey ||  || align=right | 2.3 km || 
|-id=252 bgcolor=#fefefe
| 546252 ||  || — || July 25, 2003 || Palomar || NEAT ||  || align=right data-sort-value="0.56" | 560 m || 
|-id=253 bgcolor=#fefefe
| 546253 ||  || — || December 18, 2007 || Mount Lemmon || Mount Lemmon Survey ||  || align=right data-sort-value="0.62" | 620 m || 
|-id=254 bgcolor=#fefefe
| 546254 ||  || — || October 31, 2010 || Mount Lemmon || Mount Lemmon Survey ||  || align=right data-sort-value="0.76" | 760 m || 
|-id=255 bgcolor=#d6d6d6
| 546255 ||  || — || October 31, 2010 || Mount Lemmon || Mount Lemmon Survey ||  || align=right | 2.9 km || 
|-id=256 bgcolor=#C2FFFF
| 546256 ||  || — || October 31, 2010 || Mount Lemmon || Mount Lemmon Survey || L4 || align=right | 12 km || 
|-id=257 bgcolor=#d6d6d6
| 546257 ||  || — || October 9, 2010 || Mount Lemmon || Mount Lemmon Survey ||  || align=right | 3.9 km || 
|-id=258 bgcolor=#d6d6d6
| 546258 ||  || — || October 29, 2010 || Kitt Peak || Spacewatch ||  || align=right | 2.7 km || 
|-id=259 bgcolor=#fefefe
| 546259 ||  || — || November 15, 2003 || Kitt Peak || Spacewatch ||  || align=right data-sort-value="0.61" | 610 m || 
|-id=260 bgcolor=#fefefe
| 546260 ||  || — || July 5, 2003 || Kitt Peak || Spacewatch ||  || align=right data-sort-value="0.66" | 660 m || 
|-id=261 bgcolor=#d6d6d6
| 546261 ||  || — || October 30, 2010 || Mount Lemmon || Mount Lemmon Survey ||  || align=right | 2.2 km || 
|-id=262 bgcolor=#d6d6d6
| 546262 ||  || — || September 17, 2010 || Mount Lemmon || Mount Lemmon Survey ||  || align=right | 2.4 km || 
|-id=263 bgcolor=#C2FFFF
| 546263 ||  || — || September 28, 2009 || Mount Lemmon || Mount Lemmon Survey || L4 || align=right | 8.2 km || 
|-id=264 bgcolor=#d6d6d6
| 546264 ||  || — || April 18, 2002 || Kitt Peak || Spacewatch ||  || align=right | 3.4 km || 
|-id=265 bgcolor=#d6d6d6
| 546265 ||  || — || November 25, 2005 || Kitt Peak || Spacewatch ||  || align=right | 2.6 km || 
|-id=266 bgcolor=#d6d6d6
| 546266 ||  || — || December 5, 2005 || Mount Lemmon || Mount Lemmon Survey ||  || align=right | 2.4 km || 
|-id=267 bgcolor=#fefefe
| 546267 ||  || — || January 15, 2008 || Mount Lemmon || Mount Lemmon Survey ||  || align=right data-sort-value="0.78" | 780 m || 
|-id=268 bgcolor=#fefefe
| 546268 ||  || — || October 17, 2010 || Mount Lemmon || Mount Lemmon Survey ||  || align=right data-sort-value="0.46" | 460 m || 
|-id=269 bgcolor=#d6d6d6
| 546269 ||  || — || May 18, 2002 || Palomar || NEAT || AEG || align=right | 3.9 km || 
|-id=270 bgcolor=#fefefe
| 546270 ||  || — || August 25, 2003 || Palomar || NEAT ||  || align=right data-sort-value="0.83" | 830 m || 
|-id=271 bgcolor=#d6d6d6
| 546271 ||  || — || October 14, 2010 || Mount Lemmon || Mount Lemmon Survey ||  || align=right | 2.8 km || 
|-id=272 bgcolor=#d6d6d6
| 546272 ||  || — || October 30, 2005 || Kitt Peak || Spacewatch ||  || align=right | 2.0 km || 
|-id=273 bgcolor=#C2FFFF
| 546273 ||  || — || October 16, 2010 || Pla D'Arguines || R. Ferrando, M. Ferrando || L4 || align=right | 8.0 km || 
|-id=274 bgcolor=#C2FFFF
| 546274 ||  || — || March 11, 2003 || Kitt Peak || Spacewatch || L4 || align=right | 8.1 km || 
|-id=275 bgcolor=#C2FFFF
| 546275 Kozák ||  ||  || October 30, 2010 || Piszkesteto || K. Sárneczky, Z. Kuli || L4 || align=right | 13 km || 
|-id=276 bgcolor=#fefefe
| 546276 ||  || — || July 8, 2003 || Palomar || NEAT ||  || align=right data-sort-value="0.79" | 790 m || 
|-id=277 bgcolor=#fefefe
| 546277 ||  || — || August 23, 2003 || Palomar || NEAT ||  || align=right data-sort-value="0.70" | 700 m || 
|-id=278 bgcolor=#d6d6d6
| 546278 ||  || — || December 24, 2005 || Kitt Peak || Spacewatch ||  || align=right | 2.7 km || 
|-id=279 bgcolor=#E9E9E9
| 546279 ||  || — || October 24, 2001 || Palomar || NEAT ||  || align=right | 1.6 km || 
|-id=280 bgcolor=#d6d6d6
| 546280 ||  || — || October 28, 2010 || Mount Lemmon || Mount Lemmon Survey ||  || align=right | 2.4 km || 
|-id=281 bgcolor=#d6d6d6
| 546281 ||  || — || October 29, 2010 || Mount Lemmon || Mount Lemmon Survey ||  || align=right | 3.4 km || 
|-id=282 bgcolor=#d6d6d6
| 546282 ||  || — || October 29, 2010 || Mount Lemmon || Mount Lemmon Survey ||  || align=right | 2.6 km || 
|-id=283 bgcolor=#d6d6d6
| 546283 ||  || — || October 29, 2010 || Piszkesteto || Z. Kuli, K. Sárneczky ||  || align=right | 2.9 km || 
|-id=284 bgcolor=#d6d6d6
| 546284 ||  || — || February 14, 2007 || Mauna Kea || Q. s. observers ||  || align=right | 2.2 km || 
|-id=285 bgcolor=#fefefe
| 546285 ||  || — || October 12, 2010 || Mount Lemmon || Mount Lemmon Survey ||  || align=right data-sort-value="0.70" | 700 m || 
|-id=286 bgcolor=#C2FFFF
| 546286 ||  || — || October 31, 2010 || Piszkesteto || Z. Kuli || L4 || align=right | 8.9 km || 
|-id=287 bgcolor=#fefefe
| 546287 ||  || — || December 5, 2007 || Kitt Peak || Spacewatch ||  || align=right data-sort-value="0.66" | 660 m || 
|-id=288 bgcolor=#fefefe
| 546288 ||  || — || January 18, 2008 || Mount Lemmon || Mount Lemmon Survey ||  || align=right data-sort-value="0.67" | 670 m || 
|-id=289 bgcolor=#C2FFFF
| 546289 ||  || — || October 30, 2010 || Mount Lemmon || Mount Lemmon Survey || L4 || align=right | 7.6 km || 
|-id=290 bgcolor=#d6d6d6
| 546290 ||  || — || October 14, 2010 || Mount Lemmon || Mount Lemmon Survey ||  || align=right | 2.6 km || 
|-id=291 bgcolor=#d6d6d6
| 546291 ||  || — || September 17, 2010 || Mount Lemmon || Mount Lemmon Survey ||  || align=right | 2.4 km || 
|-id=292 bgcolor=#fefefe
| 546292 ||  || — || October 19, 2010 || Mount Lemmon || Mount Lemmon Survey ||  || align=right data-sort-value="0.66" | 660 m || 
|-id=293 bgcolor=#fefefe
| 546293 ||  || — || October 29, 2010 || Catalina || CSS ||  || align=right data-sort-value="0.80" | 800 m || 
|-id=294 bgcolor=#fefefe
| 546294 ||  || — || December 31, 2007 || Mount Lemmon || Mount Lemmon Survey ||  || align=right data-sort-value="0.68" | 680 m || 
|-id=295 bgcolor=#fefefe
| 546295 ||  || — || October 17, 2010 || Mount Lemmon || Mount Lemmon Survey ||  || align=right data-sort-value="0.71" | 710 m || 
|-id=296 bgcolor=#fefefe
| 546296 ||  || — || October 29, 2010 || Kitt Peak || Spacewatch ||  || align=right data-sort-value="0.63" | 630 m || 
|-id=297 bgcolor=#d6d6d6
| 546297 ||  || — || October 17, 2010 || Mount Lemmon || Mount Lemmon Survey ||  || align=right | 2.9 km || 
|-id=298 bgcolor=#d6d6d6
| 546298 ||  || — || April 10, 2013 || Haleakala || Pan-STARRS ||  || align=right | 2.4 km || 
|-id=299 bgcolor=#d6d6d6
| 546299 ||  || — || October 29, 2010 || Kitt Peak || Spacewatch ||  || align=right | 2.6 km || 
|-id=300 bgcolor=#E9E9E9
| 546300 ||  || — || October 30, 2010 || Mount Lemmon || Mount Lemmon Survey ||  || align=right | 1.6 km || 
|}

546301–546400 

|-bgcolor=#d6d6d6
| 546301 ||  || — || October 17, 2010 || Mount Lemmon || Mount Lemmon Survey ||  || align=right | 2.9 km || 
|-id=302 bgcolor=#d6d6d6
| 546302 ||  || — || October 31, 2010 || Mount Lemmon || Mount Lemmon Survey ||  || align=right | 2.7 km || 
|-id=303 bgcolor=#d6d6d6
| 546303 ||  || — || August 14, 2015 || Haleakala || Pan-STARRS ||  || align=right | 2.3 km || 
|-id=304 bgcolor=#C2FFFF
| 546304 ||  || — || October 28, 2010 || Mount Lemmon || Mount Lemmon Survey || L4 || align=right | 6.5 km || 
|-id=305 bgcolor=#fefefe
| 546305 ||  || — || October 17, 2010 || Mount Lemmon || Mount Lemmon Survey ||  || align=right data-sort-value="0.46" | 460 m || 
|-id=306 bgcolor=#d6d6d6
| 546306 ||  || — || October 31, 2010 || Mount Lemmon || Mount Lemmon Survey ||  || align=right | 2.2 km || 
|-id=307 bgcolor=#d6d6d6
| 546307 ||  || — || May 6, 2014 || Haleakala || Pan-STARRS ||  || align=right | 2.0 km || 
|-id=308 bgcolor=#d6d6d6
| 546308 ||  || — || October 29, 2010 || Kitt Peak || Spacewatch ||  || align=right | 2.9 km || 
|-id=309 bgcolor=#d6d6d6
| 546309 ||  || — || October 29, 2010 || Kitt Peak || Spacewatch ||  || align=right | 2.5 km || 
|-id=310 bgcolor=#d6d6d6
| 546310 ||  || — || October 31, 2010 || Kitt Peak || Spacewatch ||  || align=right | 2.3 km || 
|-id=311 bgcolor=#d6d6d6
| 546311 ||  || — || September 17, 2010 || Mount Lemmon || Mount Lemmon Survey ||  || align=right | 2.2 km || 
|-id=312 bgcolor=#fefefe
| 546312 ||  || — || December 20, 2007 || Kitt Peak || Spacewatch ||  || align=right data-sort-value="0.75" | 750 m || 
|-id=313 bgcolor=#C2FFFF
| 546313 ||  || — || October 31, 2010 || Kitt Peak || Spacewatch || L4 || align=right | 6.8 km || 
|-id=314 bgcolor=#C2FFFF
| 546314 ||  || — || October 31, 2010 || Kitt Peak || Spacewatch || L4 || align=right | 8.0 km || 
|-id=315 bgcolor=#fefefe
| 546315 ||  || — || October 29, 2010 || Mount Lemmon || Mount Lemmon Survey ||  || align=right data-sort-value="0.70" | 700 m || 
|-id=316 bgcolor=#d6d6d6
| 546316 ||  || — || October 28, 2010 || Mount Lemmon || Mount Lemmon Survey ||  || align=right | 2.2 km || 
|-id=317 bgcolor=#d6d6d6
| 546317 ||  || — || September 17, 2010 || Mount Lemmon || Mount Lemmon Survey ||  || align=right | 2.8 km || 
|-id=318 bgcolor=#d6d6d6
| 546318 ||  || — || November 1, 2010 || Mount Lemmon || Mount Lemmon Survey ||  || align=right | 2.5 km || 
|-id=319 bgcolor=#fefefe
| 546319 ||  || — || September 21, 2003 || Kitt Peak || Spacewatch ||  || align=right data-sort-value="0.80" | 800 m || 
|-id=320 bgcolor=#d6d6d6
| 546320 ||  || — || April 6, 2008 || Mount Lemmon || Mount Lemmon Survey ||  || align=right | 2.0 km || 
|-id=321 bgcolor=#fefefe
| 546321 ||  || — || November 1, 2010 || Mount Lemmon || Mount Lemmon Survey ||  || align=right data-sort-value="0.62" | 620 m || 
|-id=322 bgcolor=#fefefe
| 546322 ||  || — || March 1, 2009 || Kitt Peak || Spacewatch ||  || align=right data-sort-value="0.87" | 870 m || 
|-id=323 bgcolor=#d6d6d6
| 546323 ||  || — || March 9, 2007 || Kitt Peak || Spacewatch ||  || align=right | 3.3 km || 
|-id=324 bgcolor=#fefefe
| 546324 ||  || — || September 20, 2003 || Palomar || NEAT ||  || align=right data-sort-value="0.65" | 650 m || 
|-id=325 bgcolor=#d6d6d6
| 546325 ||  || — || November 1, 2010 || Catalina || CSS ||  || align=right | 3.4 km || 
|-id=326 bgcolor=#d6d6d6
| 546326 ||  || — || March 2, 2008 || Kitt Peak || Spacewatch ||  || align=right | 2.4 km || 
|-id=327 bgcolor=#fefefe
| 546327 ||  || — || October 17, 2010 || Mount Lemmon || Mount Lemmon Survey ||  || align=right data-sort-value="0.59" | 590 m || 
|-id=328 bgcolor=#fefefe
| 546328 ||  || — || November 2, 2010 || Mount Lemmon || Mount Lemmon Survey ||  || align=right data-sort-value="0.60" | 600 m || 
|-id=329 bgcolor=#fefefe
| 546329 ||  || — || November 2, 2010 || Kitt Peak || Spacewatch ||  || align=right data-sort-value="0.57" | 570 m || 
|-id=330 bgcolor=#fefefe
| 546330 ||  || — || April 22, 2009 || Mount Lemmon || Mount Lemmon Survey ||  || align=right data-sort-value="0.52" | 520 m || 
|-id=331 bgcolor=#fefefe
| 546331 ||  || — || October 22, 2003 || Kitt Peak || Spacewatch || (2076) || align=right data-sort-value="0.54" | 540 m || 
|-id=332 bgcolor=#fefefe
| 546332 ||  || — || October 20, 2003 || Palomar || NEAT ||  || align=right data-sort-value="0.55" | 550 m || 
|-id=333 bgcolor=#d6d6d6
| 546333 ||  || — || November 1, 2010 || Kitt Peak || Spacewatch ||  || align=right | 2.8 km || 
|-id=334 bgcolor=#d6d6d6
| 546334 ||  || — || November 1, 2010 || Kitt Peak || Spacewatch ||  || align=right | 2.3 km || 
|-id=335 bgcolor=#d6d6d6
| 546335 ||  || — || June 12, 2004 || Palomar || NEAT ||  || align=right | 4.1 km || 
|-id=336 bgcolor=#d6d6d6
| 546336 ||  || — || November 2, 2010 || Kitt Peak || Spacewatch ||  || align=right | 2.9 km || 
|-id=337 bgcolor=#fefefe
| 546337 ||  || — || October 22, 2003 || Haleakala || AMOS ||  || align=right data-sort-value="0.74" | 740 m || 
|-id=338 bgcolor=#fefefe
| 546338 ||  || — || October 19, 2010 || Mount Lemmon || Mount Lemmon Survey ||  || align=right data-sort-value="0.83" | 830 m || 
|-id=339 bgcolor=#d6d6d6
| 546339 ||  || — || January 27, 2007 || Mount Lemmon || Mount Lemmon Survey ||  || align=right | 2.5 km || 
|-id=340 bgcolor=#fefefe
| 546340 ||  || — || September 5, 2010 || Mount Lemmon || Mount Lemmon Survey ||  || align=right data-sort-value="0.72" | 720 m || 
|-id=341 bgcolor=#E9E9E9
| 546341 ||  || — || July 5, 2010 || Kitt Peak || Spacewatch ||  || align=right | 3.2 km || 
|-id=342 bgcolor=#d6d6d6
| 546342 ||  || — || September 18, 2010 || Mount Lemmon || Mount Lemmon Survey ||  || align=right | 3.4 km || 
|-id=343 bgcolor=#d6d6d6
| 546343 ||  || — || September 18, 2010 || Mount Lemmon || Mount Lemmon Survey ||  || align=right | 2.3 km || 
|-id=344 bgcolor=#d6d6d6
| 546344 ||  || — || March 30, 2008 || Kitt Peak || Spacewatch ||  || align=right | 2.4 km || 
|-id=345 bgcolor=#d6d6d6
| 546345 ||  || — || October 17, 2010 || Mount Lemmon || Mount Lemmon Survey ||  || align=right | 2.4 km || 
|-id=346 bgcolor=#fefefe
| 546346 ||  || — || November 1, 2010 || Mount Lemmon || Mount Lemmon Survey ||  || align=right data-sort-value="0.51" | 510 m || 
|-id=347 bgcolor=#fefefe
| 546347 ||  || — || February 1, 2005 || Kitt Peak || Spacewatch ||  || align=right data-sort-value="0.67" | 670 m || 
|-id=348 bgcolor=#C2FFFF
| 546348 ||  || — || October 29, 2010 || Kitt Peak || Spacewatch || L4 || align=right | 8.3 km || 
|-id=349 bgcolor=#d6d6d6
| 546349 ||  || — || August 18, 2009 || Bergisch Gladbach || W. Bickel || EOS || align=right | 2.0 km || 
|-id=350 bgcolor=#fefefe
| 546350 ||  || — || March 14, 2005 || Mount Lemmon || Mount Lemmon Survey ||  || align=right data-sort-value="0.76" | 760 m || 
|-id=351 bgcolor=#d6d6d6
| 546351 ||  || — || September 30, 2005 || Mount Lemmon || Mount Lemmon Survey ||  || align=right | 1.7 km || 
|-id=352 bgcolor=#d6d6d6
| 546352 ||  || — || October 6, 2005 || Mount Lemmon || Mount Lemmon Survey ||  || align=right | 2.0 km || 
|-id=353 bgcolor=#d6d6d6
| 546353 ||  || — || November 3, 2010 || Mount Lemmon || Mount Lemmon Survey ||  || align=right | 2.9 km || 
|-id=354 bgcolor=#C2FFFF
| 546354 ||  || — || November 3, 2010 || Mount Lemmon || Mount Lemmon Survey || L4 || align=right | 7.7 km || 
|-id=355 bgcolor=#d6d6d6
| 546355 ||  || — || November 3, 2010 || Mount Lemmon || Mount Lemmon Survey ||  || align=right | 1.9 km || 
|-id=356 bgcolor=#d6d6d6
| 546356 ||  || — || May 25, 2003 || Kitt Peak || Spacewatch ||  || align=right | 2.8 km || 
|-id=357 bgcolor=#d6d6d6
| 546357 ||  || — || November 3, 2010 || Mount Lemmon || Mount Lemmon Survey ||  || align=right | 2.7 km || 
|-id=358 bgcolor=#C2FFFF
| 546358 ||  || — || July 18, 2007 || Mount Lemmon || Mount Lemmon Survey || L4 || align=right | 7.4 km || 
|-id=359 bgcolor=#fefefe
| 546359 ||  || — || November 3, 2010 || Mount Lemmon || Mount Lemmon Survey ||  || align=right data-sort-value="0.67" | 670 m || 
|-id=360 bgcolor=#d6d6d6
| 546360 ||  || — || November 4, 2010 || Mount Lemmon || Mount Lemmon Survey ||  || align=right | 2.4 km || 
|-id=361 bgcolor=#d6d6d6
| 546361 ||  || — || November 4, 2010 || Mount Lemmon || Mount Lemmon Survey ||  || align=right | 2.2 km || 
|-id=362 bgcolor=#d6d6d6
| 546362 ||  || — || December 10, 2005 || Kitt Peak || Spacewatch ||  || align=right | 2.9 km || 
|-id=363 bgcolor=#d6d6d6
| 546363 ||  || — || November 4, 2010 || Mount Lemmon || Mount Lemmon Survey ||  || align=right | 3.2 km || 
|-id=364 bgcolor=#d6d6d6
| 546364 ||  || — || November 6, 2005 || Kitt Peak || Spacewatch ||  || align=right | 2.9 km || 
|-id=365 bgcolor=#C2FFFF
| 546365 ||  || — || November 4, 2010 || Mount Lemmon || Mount Lemmon Survey || L4 || align=right | 7.3 km || 
|-id=366 bgcolor=#d6d6d6
| 546366 ||  || — || November 5, 2010 || Kitt Peak || Spacewatch ||  || align=right | 2.5 km || 
|-id=367 bgcolor=#fefefe
| 546367 ||  || — || November 5, 2010 || Mayhill-ISON || L. Elenin || H || align=right data-sort-value="0.56" | 560 m || 
|-id=368 bgcolor=#d6d6d6
| 546368 ||  || — || November 7, 2010 || Kitt Peak || Spacewatch ||  || align=right | 3.2 km || 
|-id=369 bgcolor=#d6d6d6
| 546369 ||  || — || November 1, 2010 || Mount Lemmon || Mount Lemmon Survey ||  || align=right | 2.3 km || 
|-id=370 bgcolor=#d6d6d6
| 546370 ||  || — || November 1, 2010 || Mount Lemmon || Mount Lemmon Survey ||  || align=right | 2.9 km || 
|-id=371 bgcolor=#d6d6d6
| 546371 ||  || — || September 7, 2004 || Kitt Peak || Spacewatch ||  || align=right | 3.2 km || 
|-id=372 bgcolor=#fefefe
| 546372 ||  || — || April 17, 2005 || Siding Spring || SSS ||  || align=right | 1.4 km || 
|-id=373 bgcolor=#fefefe
| 546373 ||  || — || September 28, 2003 || Kitt Peak || Spacewatch ||  || align=right data-sort-value="0.87" | 870 m || 
|-id=374 bgcolor=#fefefe
| 546374 ||  || — || November 3, 2010 || Mount Lemmon || Mount Lemmon Survey ||  || align=right data-sort-value="0.64" | 640 m || 
|-id=375 bgcolor=#d6d6d6
| 546375 ||  || — || August 10, 2010 || Kitt Peak || Spacewatch ||  || align=right | 4.1 km || 
|-id=376 bgcolor=#d6d6d6
| 546376 ||  || — || November 3, 2010 || Mount Lemmon || Mount Lemmon Survey ||  || align=right | 2.6 km || 
|-id=377 bgcolor=#d6d6d6
| 546377 ||  || — || November 3, 2010 || Mount Lemmon || Mount Lemmon Survey ||  || align=right | 3.0 km || 
|-id=378 bgcolor=#fefefe
| 546378 ||  || — || January 19, 2008 || Mount Lemmon || Mount Lemmon Survey ||  || align=right data-sort-value="0.86" | 860 m || 
|-id=379 bgcolor=#d6d6d6
| 546379 ||  || — || November 3, 2010 || Kitt Peak || Spacewatch ||  || align=right | 2.8 km || 
|-id=380 bgcolor=#d6d6d6
| 546380 ||  || — || August 21, 2004 || Siding Spring || SSS ||  || align=right | 2.8 km || 
|-id=381 bgcolor=#d6d6d6
| 546381 ||  || — || November 5, 2010 || Kitt Peak || Spacewatch ||  || align=right | 2.9 km || 
|-id=382 bgcolor=#d6d6d6
| 546382 ||  || — || November 5, 2010 || Kitt Peak || Spacewatch ||  || align=right | 3.5 km || 
|-id=383 bgcolor=#d6d6d6
| 546383 ||  || — || May 12, 2007 || Kitt Peak || Spacewatch ||  || align=right | 3.0 km || 
|-id=384 bgcolor=#d6d6d6
| 546384 ||  || — || November 6, 2010 || Kitt Peak || Spacewatch ||  || align=right | 3.7 km || 
|-id=385 bgcolor=#d6d6d6
| 546385 ||  || — || November 6, 2010 || Kitt Peak || Spacewatch ||  || align=right | 2.2 km || 
|-id=386 bgcolor=#d6d6d6
| 546386 ||  || — || November 6, 2010 || Kitt Peak || Spacewatch ||  || align=right | 2.1 km || 
|-id=387 bgcolor=#C2FFFF
| 546387 ||  || — || November 6, 2010 || Kitt Peak || Spacewatch || L4 || align=right | 7.9 km || 
|-id=388 bgcolor=#d6d6d6
| 546388 ||  || — || October 29, 2010 || Kitt Peak || Spacewatch ||  || align=right | 2.3 km || 
|-id=389 bgcolor=#d6d6d6
| 546389 ||  || — || October 14, 2010 || Mount Lemmon || Mount Lemmon Survey ||  || align=right | 2.3 km || 
|-id=390 bgcolor=#d6d6d6
| 546390 ||  || — || October 29, 2010 || Kitt Peak || Spacewatch ||  || align=right | 2.5 km || 
|-id=391 bgcolor=#d6d6d6
| 546391 ||  || — || October 29, 2010 || Kitt Peak || Spacewatch ||  || align=right | 4.0 km || 
|-id=392 bgcolor=#d6d6d6
| 546392 ||  || — || October 14, 2010 || Mount Lemmon || Mount Lemmon Survey ||  || align=right | 2.6 km || 
|-id=393 bgcolor=#d6d6d6
| 546393 ||  || — || November 6, 2010 || Kitt Peak || Spacewatch ||  || align=right | 3.2 km || 
|-id=394 bgcolor=#d6d6d6
| 546394 ||  || — || September 11, 2010 || Mount Lemmon || Mount Lemmon Survey ||  || align=right | 2.9 km || 
|-id=395 bgcolor=#d6d6d6
| 546395 ||  || — || November 7, 2010 || Mount Lemmon || Mount Lemmon Survey ||  || align=right | 2.2 km || 
|-id=396 bgcolor=#C2FFFF
| 546396 ||  || — || October 30, 2010 || Piszkesteto || Z. Kuli, K. Sárneczky || L4 || align=right | 8.3 km || 
|-id=397 bgcolor=#d6d6d6
| 546397 ||  || — || November 2, 2010 || Mount Lemmon || Mount Lemmon Survey ||  || align=right | 3.1 km || 
|-id=398 bgcolor=#d6d6d6
| 546398 ||  || — || September 30, 2010 || Mount Lemmon || Mount Lemmon Survey ||  || align=right | 3.8 km || 
|-id=399 bgcolor=#fefefe
| 546399 ||  || — || November 10, 2010 || Kitt Peak || Spacewatch || H || align=right data-sort-value="0.46" | 460 m || 
|-id=400 bgcolor=#d6d6d6
| 546400 ||  || — || November 5, 2010 || Kitt Peak || Spacewatch ||  || align=right | 3.0 km || 
|}

546401–546500 

|-bgcolor=#fefefe
| 546401 ||  || — || October 21, 2003 || Palomar || NEAT ||  || align=right data-sort-value="0.77" | 770 m || 
|-id=402 bgcolor=#d6d6d6
| 546402 ||  || — || November 5, 2010 || Kitt Peak || Spacewatch ||  || align=right | 2.2 km || 
|-id=403 bgcolor=#d6d6d6
| 546403 ||  || — || October 14, 2010 || Mount Lemmon || Mount Lemmon Survey ||  || align=right | 2.7 km || 
|-id=404 bgcolor=#fefefe
| 546404 ||  || — || November 19, 2003 || Kitt Peak || Spacewatch ||  || align=right data-sort-value="0.56" | 560 m || 
|-id=405 bgcolor=#fefefe
| 546405 ||  || — || November 24, 2003 || Socorro || LINEAR ||  || align=right data-sort-value="0.68" | 680 m || 
|-id=406 bgcolor=#C2FFFF
| 546406 ||  || — || October 12, 2010 || Mount Lemmon || Mount Lemmon Survey || L4 || align=right | 7.2 km || 
|-id=407 bgcolor=#d6d6d6
| 546407 ||  || — || October 12, 2010 || Mount Lemmon || Mount Lemmon Survey ||  || align=right | 1.8 km || 
|-id=408 bgcolor=#d6d6d6
| 546408 ||  || — || November 6, 2010 || Mount Lemmon || Mount Lemmon Survey ||  || align=right | 2.8 km || 
|-id=409 bgcolor=#d6d6d6
| 546409 ||  || — || September 11, 2010 || Mount Lemmon || Mount Lemmon Survey ||  || align=right | 3.0 km || 
|-id=410 bgcolor=#d6d6d6
| 546410 ||  || — || October 30, 2005 || Kitt Peak || Spacewatch ||  || align=right | 2.7 km || 
|-id=411 bgcolor=#fefefe
| 546411 ||  || — || November 6, 2010 || Mount Lemmon || Mount Lemmon Survey ||  || align=right data-sort-value="0.63" | 630 m || 
|-id=412 bgcolor=#fefefe
| 546412 ||  || — || October 3, 2006 || Mount Lemmon || Mount Lemmon Survey ||  || align=right data-sort-value="0.61" | 610 m || 
|-id=413 bgcolor=#d6d6d6
| 546413 ||  || — || April 6, 2008 || Kitt Peak || Spacewatch ||  || align=right | 2.8 km || 
|-id=414 bgcolor=#d6d6d6
| 546414 ||  || — || April 26, 2007 || Mount Lemmon || Mount Lemmon Survey ||  || align=right | 2.6 km || 
|-id=415 bgcolor=#d6d6d6
| 546415 ||  || — || November 7, 2010 || Mount Lemmon || Mount Lemmon Survey ||  || align=right | 3.0 km || 
|-id=416 bgcolor=#d6d6d6
| 546416 ||  || — || November 8, 2010 || Kitt Peak || Spacewatch ||  || align=right | 3.1 km || 
|-id=417 bgcolor=#d6d6d6
| 546417 ||  || — || November 3, 2010 || Kitt Peak || Spacewatch ||  || align=right | 2.2 km || 
|-id=418 bgcolor=#fefefe
| 546418 ||  || — || March 13, 2005 || Mount Lemmon || Mount Lemmon Survey ||  || align=right data-sort-value="0.76" | 760 m || 
|-id=419 bgcolor=#C2FFFF
| 546419 ||  || — || October 17, 2009 || Mount Lemmon || Mount Lemmon Survey || L4ERY || align=right | 6.7 km || 
|-id=420 bgcolor=#d6d6d6
| 546420 ||  || — || July 9, 2003 || Kitt Peak || Spacewatch ||  || align=right | 3.5 km || 
|-id=421 bgcolor=#d6d6d6
| 546421 ||  || — || November 8, 2010 || Mount Lemmon || Mount Lemmon Survey ||  || align=right | 3.1 km || 
|-id=422 bgcolor=#d6d6d6
| 546422 ||  || — || October 29, 2010 || Mount Lemmon || Mount Lemmon Survey ||  || align=right | 2.9 km || 
|-id=423 bgcolor=#d6d6d6
| 546423 ||  || — || March 30, 2008 || Kitt Peak || Spacewatch ||  || align=right | 2.9 km || 
|-id=424 bgcolor=#d6d6d6
| 546424 ||  || — || November 8, 2010 || Mount Lemmon || Mount Lemmon Survey ||  || align=right | 2.4 km || 
|-id=425 bgcolor=#fefefe
| 546425 ||  || — || October 31, 2010 || Kitt Peak || Spacewatch ||  || align=right data-sort-value="0.72" | 720 m || 
|-id=426 bgcolor=#d6d6d6
| 546426 ||  || — || October 29, 2005 || Catalina || CSS ||  || align=right | 2.7 km || 
|-id=427 bgcolor=#d6d6d6
| 546427 ||  || — || October 30, 2010 || Mount Lemmon || Mount Lemmon Survey ||  || align=right | 3.3 km || 
|-id=428 bgcolor=#fefefe
| 546428 ||  || — || November 2, 2010 || Mount Lemmon || Mount Lemmon Survey ||  || align=right data-sort-value="0.74" | 740 m || 
|-id=429 bgcolor=#d6d6d6
| 546429 ||  || — || November 10, 2010 || Catalina || CSS ||  || align=right | 2.7 km || 
|-id=430 bgcolor=#fefefe
| 546430 ||  || — || November 10, 2010 || Mount Lemmon || Mount Lemmon Survey ||  || align=right data-sort-value="0.73" | 730 m || 
|-id=431 bgcolor=#d6d6d6
| 546431 ||  || — || November 10, 2010 || Mount Lemmon || Mount Lemmon Survey ||  || align=right | 1.7 km || 
|-id=432 bgcolor=#d6d6d6
| 546432 ||  || — || May 5, 2008 || Mount Lemmon || Mount Lemmon Survey ||  || align=right | 2.9 km || 
|-id=433 bgcolor=#d6d6d6
| 546433 ||  || — || May 25, 2001 || Kitt Peak || Spacewatch ||  || align=right | 4.1 km || 
|-id=434 bgcolor=#fefefe
| 546434 ||  || — || November 20, 2003 || Kitt Peak || Spacewatch ||  || align=right data-sort-value="0.59" | 590 m || 
|-id=435 bgcolor=#fefefe
| 546435 ||  || — || October 21, 2003 || Palomar || NEAT ||  || align=right data-sort-value="0.75" | 750 m || 
|-id=436 bgcolor=#d6d6d6
| 546436 ||  || — || October 17, 2010 || Mount Lemmon || Mount Lemmon Survey ||  || align=right | 2.8 km || 
|-id=437 bgcolor=#fefefe
| 546437 ||  || — || November 6, 2010 || Mount Lemmon || Mount Lemmon Survey ||  || align=right data-sort-value="0.69" | 690 m || 
|-id=438 bgcolor=#d6d6d6
| 546438 ||  || — || November 6, 2010 || Mount Lemmon || Mount Lemmon Survey ||  || align=right | 2.8 km || 
|-id=439 bgcolor=#d6d6d6
| 546439 ||  || — || October 17, 2010 || Mount Lemmon || Mount Lemmon Survey ||  || align=right | 2.7 km || 
|-id=440 bgcolor=#fefefe
| 546440 ||  || — || February 11, 2008 || Mount Lemmon || Mount Lemmon Survey ||  || align=right data-sort-value="0.71" | 710 m || 
|-id=441 bgcolor=#d6d6d6
| 546441 ||  || — || November 6, 2010 || Mount Lemmon || Mount Lemmon Survey ||  || align=right | 2.7 km || 
|-id=442 bgcolor=#d6d6d6
| 546442 ||  || — || November 6, 2010 || Mount Lemmon || Mount Lemmon Survey ||  || align=right | 1.9 km || 
|-id=443 bgcolor=#C2FFFF
| 546443 ||  || — || September 15, 2009 || Kitt Peak || Spacewatch || L4 || align=right | 7.1 km || 
|-id=444 bgcolor=#d6d6d6
| 546444 ||  || — || November 6, 2010 || Mount Lemmon || Mount Lemmon Survey ||  || align=right | 2.7 km || 
|-id=445 bgcolor=#d6d6d6
| 546445 ||  || — || November 6, 2010 || Mount Lemmon || Mount Lemmon Survey ||  || align=right | 2.2 km || 
|-id=446 bgcolor=#d6d6d6
| 546446 ||  || — || November 6, 2010 || Mount Lemmon || Mount Lemmon Survey ||  || align=right | 3.0 km || 
|-id=447 bgcolor=#d6d6d6
| 546447 ||  || — || November 7, 2010 || Mount Lemmon || Mount Lemmon Survey ||  || align=right | 2.4 km || 
|-id=448 bgcolor=#fefefe
| 546448 ||  || — || April 9, 2002 || Kitt Peak || Spacewatch ||  || align=right data-sort-value="0.75" | 750 m || 
|-id=449 bgcolor=#E9E9E9
| 546449 ||  || — || November 7, 2010 || Mount Lemmon || Mount Lemmon Survey ||  || align=right | 1.5 km || 
|-id=450 bgcolor=#fefefe
| 546450 ||  || — || December 30, 2007 || Mount Lemmon || Mount Lemmon Survey ||  || align=right data-sort-value="0.58" | 580 m || 
|-id=451 bgcolor=#d6d6d6
| 546451 ||  || — || September 11, 2010 || Mount Lemmon || Mount Lemmon Survey ||  || align=right | 2.1 km || 
|-id=452 bgcolor=#fefefe
| 546452 ||  || — || September 30, 2003 || Kitt Peak || Spacewatch ||  || align=right data-sort-value="0.81" | 810 m || 
|-id=453 bgcolor=#d6d6d6
| 546453 ||  || — || November 8, 2010 || Mauna Kea || P. Forshay, M. Micheli || EOS || align=right | 1.7 km || 
|-id=454 bgcolor=#C2FFFF
| 546454 ||  || — || November 8, 2010 || Mount Lemmon || Mount Lemmon Survey || L4 || align=right | 7.2 km || 
|-id=455 bgcolor=#fefefe
| 546455 ||  || — || October 29, 2003 || Kitt Peak || Spacewatch ||  || align=right data-sort-value="0.76" | 760 m || 
|-id=456 bgcolor=#d6d6d6
| 546456 ||  || — || November 8, 2010 || Mount Lemmon || Mount Lemmon Survey ||  || align=right | 2.4 km || 
|-id=457 bgcolor=#d6d6d6
| 546457 ||  || — || January 7, 2006 || Kitt Peak || Spacewatch ||  || align=right | 2.6 km || 
|-id=458 bgcolor=#C2FFFF
| 546458 ||  || — || October 29, 2010 || Kitt Peak || Spacewatch || L4 || align=right | 8.9 km || 
|-id=459 bgcolor=#d6d6d6
| 546459 ||  || — || September 24, 2009 || Kitt Peak || Spacewatch ||  || align=right | 3.4 km || 
|-id=460 bgcolor=#C2FFFF
| 546460 ||  || — || October 31, 2010 || Kitt Peak || Spacewatch || L4ERY || align=right | 6.4 km || 
|-id=461 bgcolor=#C2FFFF
| 546461 ||  || — || November 10, 2010 || Mount Lemmon || Mount Lemmon Survey || L4 || align=right | 7.5 km || 
|-id=462 bgcolor=#d6d6d6
| 546462 ||  || — || November 10, 2010 || Mount Lemmon || Mount Lemmon Survey ||  || align=right | 2.9 km || 
|-id=463 bgcolor=#d6d6d6
| 546463 ||  || — || November 1, 2010 || Kitt Peak || Spacewatch ||  || align=right | 3.7 km || 
|-id=464 bgcolor=#d6d6d6
| 546464 ||  || — || November 10, 2010 || Mount Lemmon || Mount Lemmon Survey ||  || align=right | 2.8 km || 
|-id=465 bgcolor=#d6d6d6
| 546465 ||  || — || November 10, 2010 || Mount Lemmon || Mount Lemmon Survey ||  || align=right | 2.0 km || 
|-id=466 bgcolor=#fefefe
| 546466 ||  || — || September 19, 2003 || Palomar || NEAT ||  || align=right data-sort-value="0.79" | 790 m || 
|-id=467 bgcolor=#C2FFFF
| 546467 ||  || — || October 26, 2009 || Mount Lemmon || Mount Lemmon Survey || L4 || align=right | 10 km || 
|-id=468 bgcolor=#C2FFFF
| 546468 ||  || — || November 10, 2010 || Mount Lemmon || Mount Lemmon Survey || L4 || align=right | 7.8 km || 
|-id=469 bgcolor=#d6d6d6
| 546469 ||  || — || November 10, 2010 || Mount Lemmon || Mount Lemmon Survey ||  || align=right | 2.2 km || 
|-id=470 bgcolor=#d6d6d6
| 546470 ||  || — || October 30, 2010 || Kitt Peak || Spacewatch ||  || align=right | 2.9 km || 
|-id=471 bgcolor=#d6d6d6
| 546471 Szipál ||  ||  || November 1, 2010 || Piszkesteto || Z. Kuli ||  || align=right | 3.2 km || 
|-id=472 bgcolor=#d6d6d6
| 546472 ||  || — || October 14, 2010 || Mount Lemmon || Mount Lemmon Survey ||  || align=right | 2.8 km || 
|-id=473 bgcolor=#d6d6d6
| 546473 ||  || — || July 29, 2009 || Kitt Peak || Spacewatch ||  || align=right | 3.3 km || 
|-id=474 bgcolor=#d6d6d6
| 546474 ||  || — || November 11, 2010 || Mount Lemmon || Mount Lemmon Survey ||  || align=right | 3.0 km || 
|-id=475 bgcolor=#d6d6d6
| 546475 ||  || — || November 11, 2010 || Mount Lemmon || Mount Lemmon Survey ||  || align=right | 2.3 km || 
|-id=476 bgcolor=#fefefe
| 546476 ||  || — || November 11, 2010 || Mount Lemmon || Mount Lemmon Survey ||  || align=right data-sort-value="0.71" | 710 m || 
|-id=477 bgcolor=#d6d6d6
| 546477 ||  || — || November 11, 2010 || Mount Lemmon || Mount Lemmon Survey ||  || align=right | 3.0 km || 
|-id=478 bgcolor=#fefefe
| 546478 ||  || — || November 11, 2010 || Mount Lemmon || Mount Lemmon Survey ||  || align=right data-sort-value="0.83" | 830 m || 
|-id=479 bgcolor=#d6d6d6
| 546479 ||  || — || March 9, 2002 || Kitt Peak || Spacewatch ||  || align=right | 2.8 km || 
|-id=480 bgcolor=#d6d6d6
| 546480 ||  || — || November 12, 2010 || Kitt Peak || Spacewatch ||  || align=right | 3.1 km || 
|-id=481 bgcolor=#d6d6d6
| 546481 ||  || — || October 30, 2010 || Mount Lemmon || Mount Lemmon Survey ||  || align=right | 2.4 km || 
|-id=482 bgcolor=#d6d6d6
| 546482 ||  || — || November 13, 2010 || Vail-Jarnac || T. Glinos ||  || align=right | 2.8 km || 
|-id=483 bgcolor=#d6d6d6
| 546483 ||  || — || November 13, 2010 || Mount Lemmon || Mount Lemmon Survey ||  || align=right | 2.7 km || 
|-id=484 bgcolor=#fefefe
| 546484 ||  || — || November 13, 2010 || Kitt Peak || Spacewatch ||  || align=right data-sort-value="0.60" | 600 m || 
|-id=485 bgcolor=#d6d6d6
| 546485 ||  || — || August 21, 2004 || Siding Spring || SSS ||  || align=right | 2.6 km || 
|-id=486 bgcolor=#d6d6d6
| 546486 ||  || — || January 18, 2001 || Haleakala || AMOS ||  || align=right | 4.1 km || 
|-id=487 bgcolor=#d6d6d6
| 546487 ||  || — || November 8, 2010 || Catalina || CSS ||  || align=right | 2.8 km || 
|-id=488 bgcolor=#d6d6d6
| 546488 ||  || — || January 19, 2007 || Mauna Kea || Q. s. observers ||  || align=right | 2.2 km || 
|-id=489 bgcolor=#d6d6d6
| 546489 ||  || — || November 11, 2010 || Kitt Peak || Spacewatch ||  || align=right | 3.0 km || 
|-id=490 bgcolor=#C2FFFF
| 546490 ||  || — || October 30, 2010 || Kitt Peak || Spacewatch || L4 || align=right | 9.9 km || 
|-id=491 bgcolor=#C2FFFF
| 546491 ||  || — || September 15, 2009 || Kitt Peak || Spacewatch || L4 || align=right | 7.5 km || 
|-id=492 bgcolor=#fefefe
| 546492 ||  || — || April 20, 2009 || Kitt Peak || Spacewatch ||  || align=right data-sort-value="0.69" | 690 m || 
|-id=493 bgcolor=#C2FFFF
| 546493 ||  || — || September 18, 2009 || Catalina || CSS || L4 || align=right | 10 km || 
|-id=494 bgcolor=#d6d6d6
| 546494 ||  || — || January 2, 2012 || Mount Lemmon || Mount Lemmon Survey || EOS || align=right | 2.3 km || 
|-id=495 bgcolor=#fefefe
| 546495 ||  || — || September 20, 2003 || Palomar || NEAT || V || align=right data-sort-value="0.57" | 570 m || 
|-id=496 bgcolor=#fefefe
| 546496 ||  || — || September 18, 2003 || Palomar || NEAT ||  || align=right data-sort-value="0.58" | 580 m || 
|-id=497 bgcolor=#fefefe
| 546497 ||  || — || March 10, 2002 || Kitt Peak || Spacewatch ||  || align=right data-sort-value="0.98" | 980 m || 
|-id=498 bgcolor=#d6d6d6
| 546498 ||  || — || October 31, 2010 || Piszkesteto || Z. Kuli, K. Sárneczky ||  || align=right | 3.0 km || 
|-id=499 bgcolor=#d6d6d6
| 546499 ||  || — || December 26, 2011 || Kitt Peak || Spacewatch ||  || align=right | 2.9 km || 
|-id=500 bgcolor=#fefefe
| 546500 ||  || — || March 10, 2002 || Kitt Peak || Spacewatch ||  || align=right data-sort-value="0.82" | 820 m || 
|}

546501–546600 

|-bgcolor=#d6d6d6
| 546501 ||  || — || January 24, 2012 || Haleakala || Pan-STARRS ||  || align=right | 3.1 km || 
|-id=502 bgcolor=#fefefe
| 546502 ||  || — || April 13, 2012 || Haleakala || Pan-STARRS ||  || align=right data-sort-value="0.76" | 760 m || 
|-id=503 bgcolor=#d6d6d6
| 546503 ||  || — || October 8, 2010 || Catalina || CSS ||  || align=right | 2.4 km || 
|-id=504 bgcolor=#d6d6d6
| 546504 ||  || — || October 15, 2010 || Mayhill-ISON || L. Elenin || EOS || align=right | 1.8 km || 
|-id=505 bgcolor=#fefefe
| 546505 ||  || — || September 17, 2003 || Kitt Peak || Spacewatch || (2076) || align=right data-sort-value="0.49" | 490 m || 
|-id=506 bgcolor=#d6d6d6
| 546506 ||  || — || November 9, 2010 || Catalina || CSS ||  || align=right | 2.5 km || 
|-id=507 bgcolor=#fefefe
| 546507 ||  || — || April 14, 2005 || Catalina || CSS ||  || align=right data-sort-value="0.91" | 910 m || 
|-id=508 bgcolor=#d6d6d6
| 546508 ||  || — || November 3, 2010 || Mayhill-ISON || L. Elenin ||  || align=right | 3.6 km || 
|-id=509 bgcolor=#d6d6d6
| 546509 ||  || — || February 13, 2012 || Haleakala || Pan-STARRS ||  || align=right | 3.1 km || 
|-id=510 bgcolor=#fefefe
| 546510 ||  || — || September 25, 2003 || Palomar || NEAT ||  || align=right data-sort-value="0.81" | 810 m || 
|-id=511 bgcolor=#d6d6d6
| 546511 ||  || — || October 10, 2010 || Kitt Peak || Spacewatch || EOS || align=right | 2.0 km || 
|-id=512 bgcolor=#C2FFFF
| 546512 ||  || — || October 18, 2010 || Mount Lemmon || Mount Lemmon Survey || L4 || align=right | 8.2 km || 
|-id=513 bgcolor=#d6d6d6
| 546513 ||  || — || November 4, 2010 || Palomar || PTF ||  || align=right | 3.1 km || 
|-id=514 bgcolor=#fefefe
| 546514 ||  || — || November 28, 2010 || Kitt Peak || Spacewatch ||  || align=right data-sort-value="0.76" | 760 m || 
|-id=515 bgcolor=#d6d6d6
| 546515 Almásy ||  ||  || October 31, 2010 || Piszkesteto || Z. Kuli ||  || align=right | 4.3 km || 
|-id=516 bgcolor=#d6d6d6
| 546516 ||  || — || March 31, 2008 || Mount Lemmon || Mount Lemmon Survey ||  || align=right | 3.1 km || 
|-id=517 bgcolor=#d6d6d6
| 546517 ||  || — || August 22, 2004 || Kitt Peak || Spacewatch ||  || align=right | 3.0 km || 
|-id=518 bgcolor=#d6d6d6
| 546518 ||  || — || September 11, 2004 || Kitt Peak || Spacewatch ||  || align=right | 2.1 km || 
|-id=519 bgcolor=#d6d6d6
| 546519 ||  || — || November 2, 2010 || Mount Lemmon || Mount Lemmon Survey ||  || align=right | 2.1 km || 
|-id=520 bgcolor=#d6d6d6
| 546520 ||  || — || November 14, 2010 || Catalina || CSS ||  || align=right | 2.1 km || 
|-id=521 bgcolor=#d6d6d6
| 546521 ||  || — || November 1, 2010 || Mount Lemmon || Mount Lemmon Survey ||  || align=right | 2.3 km || 
|-id=522 bgcolor=#d6d6d6
| 546522 ||  || — || November 3, 2010 || Mount Lemmon || Mount Lemmon Survey ||  || align=right | 2.7 km || 
|-id=523 bgcolor=#d6d6d6
| 546523 ||  || — || October 17, 2010 || Mount Lemmon || Mount Lemmon Survey ||  || align=right | 2.3 km || 
|-id=524 bgcolor=#fefefe
| 546524 ||  || — || October 12, 2010 || Mount Lemmon || Mount Lemmon Survey ||  || align=right data-sort-value="0.47" | 470 m || 
|-id=525 bgcolor=#C2FFFF
| 546525 ||  || — || November 6, 2010 || Mount Lemmon || Mount Lemmon Survey || L4 || align=right | 7.6 km || 
|-id=526 bgcolor=#C2FFFF
| 546526 ||  || — || November 1, 2010 || Mount Lemmon || Mount Lemmon Survey || L4 || align=right | 7.3 km || 
|-id=527 bgcolor=#C2FFFF
| 546527 ||  || — || November 5, 2010 || Mount Lemmon || Mount Lemmon Survey || L4 || align=right | 9.6 km || 
|-id=528 bgcolor=#d6d6d6
| 546528 ||  || — || October 29, 2010 || Kitt Peak || Spacewatch ||  || align=right | 2.7 km || 
|-id=529 bgcolor=#d6d6d6
| 546529 ||  || — || November 7, 2010 || Mount Lemmon || Mount Lemmon Survey ||  || align=right | 2.3 km || 
|-id=530 bgcolor=#fefefe
| 546530 ||  || — || January 30, 2008 || Kitt Peak || Spacewatch ||  || align=right data-sort-value="0.59" | 590 m || 
|-id=531 bgcolor=#d6d6d6
| 546531 ||  || — || December 1, 2011 || ESA OGS || ESA OGS ||  || align=right | 3.4 km || 
|-id=532 bgcolor=#d6d6d6
| 546532 ||  || — || November 1, 2010 || Mount Lemmon || Mount Lemmon Survey ||  || align=right | 2.5 km || 
|-id=533 bgcolor=#fefefe
| 546533 ||  || — || November 6, 2010 || Kitt Peak || Spacewatch ||  || align=right data-sort-value="0.52" | 520 m || 
|-id=534 bgcolor=#d6d6d6
| 546534 ||  || — || February 3, 2012 || Mount Lemmon || Mount Lemmon Survey ||  || align=right | 2.9 km || 
|-id=535 bgcolor=#d6d6d6
| 546535 ||  || — || November 15, 2010 || Mount Lemmon || Mount Lemmon Survey ||  || align=right | 2.9 km || 
|-id=536 bgcolor=#fefefe
| 546536 ||  || — || August 14, 2013 || Haleakala || Pan-STARRS ||  || align=right data-sort-value="0.63" | 630 m || 
|-id=537 bgcolor=#fefefe
| 546537 ||  || — || November 14, 2010 || Catalina || CSS || H || align=right data-sort-value="0.61" | 610 m || 
|-id=538 bgcolor=#d6d6d6
| 546538 ||  || — || November 5, 2010 || Mount Lemmon || Mount Lemmon Survey ||  || align=right | 2.9 km || 
|-id=539 bgcolor=#d6d6d6
| 546539 ||  || — || January 30, 2012 || Mount Lemmon || Mount Lemmon Survey ||  || align=right | 2.5 km || 
|-id=540 bgcolor=#d6d6d6
| 546540 ||  || — || December 26, 2011 || Kitt Peak || Spacewatch ||  || align=right | 3.4 km || 
|-id=541 bgcolor=#fefefe
| 546541 ||  || — || February 16, 2012 || Haleakala || Pan-STARRS ||  || align=right data-sort-value="0.64" | 640 m || 
|-id=542 bgcolor=#d6d6d6
| 546542 ||  || — || November 1, 2010 || Mount Lemmon || Mount Lemmon Survey ||  || align=right | 2.3 km || 
|-id=543 bgcolor=#C2FFFF
| 546543 ||  || — || November 1, 2010 || Kitt Peak || Spacewatch || L4 || align=right | 8.9 km || 
|-id=544 bgcolor=#d6d6d6
| 546544 ||  || — || November 12, 2010 || Mount Lemmon || Mount Lemmon Survey ||  || align=right | 2.7 km || 
|-id=545 bgcolor=#d6d6d6
| 546545 ||  || — || November 11, 2010 || Mount Lemmon || Mount Lemmon Survey ||  || align=right | 2.3 km || 
|-id=546 bgcolor=#d6d6d6
| 546546 ||  || — || November 6, 2010 || Kitt Peak || Spacewatch ||  || align=right | 2.2 km || 
|-id=547 bgcolor=#d6d6d6
| 546547 ||  || — || January 19, 2012 || Kitt Peak || Spacewatch ||  || align=right | 2.6 km || 
|-id=548 bgcolor=#d6d6d6
| 546548 ||  || — || April 12, 2013 || Haleakala || Pan-STARRS ||  || align=right | 2.5 km || 
|-id=549 bgcolor=#d6d6d6
| 546549 ||  || — || December 5, 2005 || Mount Lemmon || Mount Lemmon Survey ||  || align=right | 2.6 km || 
|-id=550 bgcolor=#d6d6d6
| 546550 ||  || — || March 13, 2013 || Catalina || CSS ||  || align=right | 2.9 km || 
|-id=551 bgcolor=#fefefe
| 546551 ||  || — || November 3, 2010 || Mount Lemmon || Mount Lemmon Survey ||  || align=right data-sort-value="0.65" | 650 m || 
|-id=552 bgcolor=#E9E9E9
| 546552 ||  || — || August 20, 2014 || Haleakala || Pan-STARRS ||  || align=right | 1.5 km || 
|-id=553 bgcolor=#fefefe
| 546553 ||  || — || July 13, 2013 || Haleakala || Pan-STARRS ||  || align=right data-sort-value="0.54" | 540 m || 
|-id=554 bgcolor=#d6d6d6
| 546554 ||  || — || December 28, 2005 || Kitt Peak || Spacewatch ||  || align=right | 2.6 km || 
|-id=555 bgcolor=#d6d6d6
| 546555 ||  || — || November 2, 2010 || Mount Lemmon || Mount Lemmon Survey ||  || align=right | 2.5 km || 
|-id=556 bgcolor=#d6d6d6
| 546556 ||  || — || July 1, 2014 || Haleakala || Pan-STARRS ||  || align=right | 2.2 km || 
|-id=557 bgcolor=#fefefe
| 546557 ||  || — || September 11, 2010 || Mount Lemmon || Mount Lemmon Survey ||  || align=right data-sort-value="0.53" | 530 m || 
|-id=558 bgcolor=#d6d6d6
| 546558 ||  || — || November 2, 2010 || Mount Lemmon || Mount Lemmon Survey ||  || align=right | 1.9 km || 
|-id=559 bgcolor=#d6d6d6
| 546559 ||  || — || November 11, 2010 || Mount Lemmon || Mount Lemmon Survey ||  || align=right | 2.9 km || 
|-id=560 bgcolor=#d6d6d6
| 546560 ||  || — || November 8, 2010 || Mount Lemmon || Mount Lemmon Survey ||  || align=right | 2.2 km || 
|-id=561 bgcolor=#d6d6d6
| 546561 ||  || — || December 29, 2011 || Mount Lemmon || Mount Lemmon Survey ||  || align=right | 2.3 km || 
|-id=562 bgcolor=#d6d6d6
| 546562 ||  || — || November 14, 2010 || Mount Lemmon || Mount Lemmon Survey ||  || align=right | 2.6 km || 
|-id=563 bgcolor=#d6d6d6
| 546563 ||  || — || April 10, 2013 || Mount Lemmon || Mount Lemmon Survey ||  || align=right | 2.9 km || 
|-id=564 bgcolor=#fefefe
| 546564 ||  || — || November 13, 2010 || Kitt Peak || Spacewatch ||  || align=right data-sort-value="0.83" | 830 m || 
|-id=565 bgcolor=#d6d6d6
| 546565 ||  || — || January 13, 2018 || Mount Lemmon || Mount Lemmon Survey ||  || align=right | 2.6 km || 
|-id=566 bgcolor=#d6d6d6
| 546566 ||  || — || November 10, 2010 || Mount Lemmon || Mount Lemmon Survey ||  || align=right | 2.5 km || 
|-id=567 bgcolor=#d6d6d6
| 546567 ||  || — || November 11, 2010 || Mount Lemmon || Mount Lemmon Survey ||  || align=right | 2.5 km || 
|-id=568 bgcolor=#d6d6d6
| 546568 ||  || — || September 5, 2010 || Mount Lemmon || Mount Lemmon Survey ||  || align=right | 2.8 km || 
|-id=569 bgcolor=#d6d6d6
| 546569 ||  || — || January 19, 2012 || Haleakala || Pan-STARRS ||  || align=right | 2.0 km || 
|-id=570 bgcolor=#d6d6d6
| 546570 ||  || — || November 2, 2010 || Mount Lemmon || Mount Lemmon Survey ||  || align=right | 2.7 km || 
|-id=571 bgcolor=#d6d6d6
| 546571 ||  || — || November 13, 2010 || Kitt Peak || Spacewatch ||  || align=right | 3.0 km || 
|-id=572 bgcolor=#d6d6d6
| 546572 ||  || — || November 2, 2010 || Mount Lemmon || Mount Lemmon Survey ||  || align=right | 2.3 km || 
|-id=573 bgcolor=#C2FFFF
| 546573 ||  || — || November 6, 2010 || Mount Lemmon || Mount Lemmon Survey || L4 || align=right | 7.7 km || 
|-id=574 bgcolor=#d6d6d6
| 546574 ||  || — || April 10, 2013 || Haleakala || Pan-STARRS ||  || align=right | 2.5 km || 
|-id=575 bgcolor=#d6d6d6
| 546575 ||  || — || November 1, 2010 || Kitt Peak || Spacewatch ||  || align=right | 2.8 km || 
|-id=576 bgcolor=#fefefe
| 546576 ||  || — || November 11, 2010 || Kitt Peak || Spacewatch ||  || align=right data-sort-value="0.62" | 620 m || 
|-id=577 bgcolor=#fefefe
| 546577 ||  || — || January 19, 2012 || Haleakala || Pan-STARRS ||  || align=right data-sort-value="0.62" | 620 m || 
|-id=578 bgcolor=#d6d6d6
| 546578 ||  || — || September 11, 2015 || Haleakala || Pan-STARRS ||  || align=right | 2.1 km || 
|-id=579 bgcolor=#C2FFFF
| 546579 ||  || — || January 17, 2013 || Haleakala || Pan-STARRS || L4 || align=right | 6.6 km || 
|-id=580 bgcolor=#d6d6d6
| 546580 ||  || — || November 11, 2010 || Kitt Peak || Spacewatch ||  || align=right | 2.6 km || 
|-id=581 bgcolor=#d6d6d6
| 546581 ||  || — || November 4, 2010 || Mount Lemmon || Mount Lemmon Survey ||  || align=right | 2.3 km || 
|-id=582 bgcolor=#d6d6d6
| 546582 ||  || — || November 13, 2010 || Mount Lemmon || Mount Lemmon Survey ||  || align=right | 2.4 km || 
|-id=583 bgcolor=#d6d6d6
| 546583 ||  || — || November 13, 2010 || Mount Lemmon || Mount Lemmon Survey ||  || align=right | 2.3 km || 
|-id=584 bgcolor=#d6d6d6
| 546584 ||  || — || November 8, 2010 || Mount Lemmon || Mount Lemmon Survey ||  || align=right | 2.5 km || 
|-id=585 bgcolor=#C2FFFF
| 546585 ||  || — || November 18, 2011 || Kitt Peak || Spacewatch || L4 || align=right | 9.6 km || 
|-id=586 bgcolor=#d6d6d6
| 546586 ||  || — || September 17, 2010 || Mount Lemmon || Mount Lemmon Survey ||  || align=right | 2.1 km || 
|-id=587 bgcolor=#C2FFFF
| 546587 ||  || — || February 5, 2013 || Mount Lemmon || Mount Lemmon Survey || L4 || align=right | 7.4 km || 
|-id=588 bgcolor=#C2FFFF
| 546588 ||  || — || November 12, 2010 || Kitt Peak || Spacewatch || L4 || align=right | 7.1 km || 
|-id=589 bgcolor=#fefefe
| 546589 ||  || — || July 13, 2013 || Haleakala || Pan-STARRS ||  || align=right data-sort-value="0.53" | 530 m || 
|-id=590 bgcolor=#C2FFFF
| 546590 ||  || — || November 1, 2010 || Kitt Peak || Spacewatch || L4 || align=right | 6.6 km || 
|-id=591 bgcolor=#d6d6d6
| 546591 ||  || — || November 3, 2010 || Kitt Peak || Spacewatch ||  || align=right | 1.8 km || 
|-id=592 bgcolor=#C2FFFF
| 546592 ||  || — || November 2, 2010 || Mount Lemmon || Mount Lemmon Survey || L4 || align=right | 6.5 km || 
|-id=593 bgcolor=#C2FFFF
| 546593 ||  || — || November 7, 2010 || Kitt Peak || Spacewatch || L4 || align=right | 8.0 km || 
|-id=594 bgcolor=#C2FFFF
| 546594 ||  || — || November 12, 2010 || Kitt Peak || Spacewatch || L4 || align=right | 7.0 km || 
|-id=595 bgcolor=#d6d6d6
| 546595 ||  || — || November 10, 2010 || Kitt Peak || Spacewatch ||  || align=right | 2.8 km || 
|-id=596 bgcolor=#E9E9E9
| 546596 ||  || — || November 10, 2010 || Mount Lemmon || Mount Lemmon Survey ||  || align=right | 1.5 km || 
|-id=597 bgcolor=#fefefe
| 546597 ||  || — || November 4, 2010 || Mount Lemmon || Mount Lemmon Survey ||  || align=right data-sort-value="0.58" | 580 m || 
|-id=598 bgcolor=#d6d6d6
| 546598 ||  || — || November 10, 2010 || Mount Lemmon || Mount Lemmon Survey ||  || align=right | 1.9 km || 
|-id=599 bgcolor=#fefefe
| 546599 ||  || — || November 3, 2010 || Mount Lemmon || Mount Lemmon Survey ||  || align=right data-sort-value="0.65" | 650 m || 
|-id=600 bgcolor=#d6d6d6
| 546600 ||  || — || November 2, 2010 || Mount Lemmon || Mount Lemmon Survey ||  || align=right | 2.7 km || 
|}

546601–546700 

|-bgcolor=#fefefe
| 546601 ||  || — || November 6, 2010 || Kitt Peak || Spacewatch ||  || align=right data-sort-value="0.55" | 550 m || 
|-id=602 bgcolor=#fefefe
| 546602 ||  || — || November 7, 2010 || Mount Lemmon || Mount Lemmon Survey ||  || align=right data-sort-value="0.78" | 780 m || 
|-id=603 bgcolor=#d6d6d6
| 546603 ||  || — || November 17, 2010 || Kitt Peak || Spacewatch ||  || align=right | 2.1 km || 
|-id=604 bgcolor=#d6d6d6
| 546604 ||  || — || April 14, 2008 || Kitt Peak || Spacewatch ||  || align=right | 2.6 km || 
|-id=605 bgcolor=#d6d6d6
| 546605 ||  || — || April 29, 2008 || Mount Lemmon || Mount Lemmon Survey ||  || align=right | 3.3 km || 
|-id=606 bgcolor=#d6d6d6
| 546606 ||  || — || November 26, 2010 || Mount Lemmon || Mount Lemmon Survey ||  || align=right | 2.5 km || 
|-id=607 bgcolor=#d6d6d6
| 546607 ||  || — || October 9, 2004 || Kitt Peak || Spacewatch ||  || align=right | 3.2 km || 
|-id=608 bgcolor=#d6d6d6
| 546608 ||  || — || October 28, 2010 || Mount Lemmon || Mount Lemmon Survey ||  || align=right | 2.6 km || 
|-id=609 bgcolor=#d6d6d6
| 546609 ||  || — || August 12, 2004 || Palomar || NEAT ||  || align=right | 3.2 km || 
|-id=610 bgcolor=#d6d6d6
| 546610 ||  || — || November 7, 2010 || Mount Lemmon || Mount Lemmon Survey ||  || align=right | 2.1 km || 
|-id=611 bgcolor=#d6d6d6
| 546611 ||  || — || November 30, 2005 || Kitt Peak || Spacewatch ||  || align=right | 1.7 km || 
|-id=612 bgcolor=#d6d6d6
| 546612 ||  || — || November 27, 2010 || Mount Lemmon || Mount Lemmon Survey ||  || align=right | 2.7 km || 
|-id=613 bgcolor=#d6d6d6
| 546613 ||  || — || November 14, 2010 || Kitt Peak || Spacewatch ||  || align=right | 2.2 km || 
|-id=614 bgcolor=#fefefe
| 546614 ||  || — || December 1, 2010 || Magdalena Ridge || W. H. Ryan || H || align=right data-sort-value="0.70" | 700 m || 
|-id=615 bgcolor=#d6d6d6
| 546615 ||  || — || October 9, 2004 || Kitt Peak || Spacewatch ||  || align=right | 3.5 km || 
|-id=616 bgcolor=#d6d6d6
| 546616 ||  || — || October 30, 2010 || Kitt Peak || Spacewatch ||  || align=right | 3.7 km || 
|-id=617 bgcolor=#d6d6d6
| 546617 ||  || — || November 5, 2010 || Mount Lemmon || Mount Lemmon Survey ||  || align=right | 2.3 km || 
|-id=618 bgcolor=#C2FFFF
| 546618 ||  || — || September 22, 2009 || Kitt Peak || Spacewatch || L4 || align=right | 7.5 km || 
|-id=619 bgcolor=#d6d6d6
| 546619 ||  || — || November 15, 2010 || Mount Lemmon || Mount Lemmon Survey ||  || align=right | 3.6 km || 
|-id=620 bgcolor=#d6d6d6
| 546620 ||  || — || November 16, 2010 || Mount Lemmon || Mount Lemmon Survey ||  || align=right | 2.7 km || 
|-id=621 bgcolor=#d6d6d6
| 546621 ||  || — || November 15, 2010 || Mount Lemmon || Mount Lemmon Survey ||  || align=right | 2.5 km || 
|-id=622 bgcolor=#d6d6d6
| 546622 ||  || — || October 30, 2010 || Mount Lemmon || Mount Lemmon Survey ||  || align=right | 2.1 km || 
|-id=623 bgcolor=#C2FFFF
| 546623 ||  || — || November 12, 2010 || Mount Lemmon || Mount Lemmon Survey || L4 || align=right | 9.4 km || 
|-id=624 bgcolor=#d6d6d6
| 546624 ||  || — || November 26, 2010 || Mount Lemmon || Mount Lemmon Survey ||  || align=right | 2.4 km || 
|-id=625 bgcolor=#d6d6d6
| 546625 ||  || — || December 21, 2005 || Kitt Peak || Spacewatch ||  || align=right | 2.0 km || 
|-id=626 bgcolor=#d6d6d6
| 546626 ||  || — || November 1, 2010 || Kitt Peak || Spacewatch ||  || align=right | 2.7 km || 
|-id=627 bgcolor=#C2FFFF
| 546627 ||  || — || September 17, 2009 || Kitt Peak || Spacewatch || L4 || align=right | 8.6 km || 
|-id=628 bgcolor=#d6d6d6
| 546628 ||  || — || November 26, 2010 || Zadko || M. Todd ||  || align=right | 2.8 km || 
|-id=629 bgcolor=#fefefe
| 546629 ||  || — || April 7, 2005 || Kitt Peak || Spacewatch ||  || align=right data-sort-value="0.68" | 680 m || 
|-id=630 bgcolor=#d6d6d6
| 546630 ||  || — || October 29, 2010 || Kitt Peak || Spacewatch ||  || align=right | 2.8 km || 
|-id=631 bgcolor=#fefefe
| 546631 ||  || — || November 27, 2010 || Mount Lemmon || Mount Lemmon Survey ||  || align=right data-sort-value="0.72" | 720 m || 
|-id=632 bgcolor=#fefefe
| 546632 ||  || — || April 4, 2008 || Catalina || CSS ||  || align=right data-sort-value="0.71" | 710 m || 
|-id=633 bgcolor=#d6d6d6
| 546633 ||  || — || November 6, 2010 || Kitt Peak || Spacewatch ||  || align=right | 2.4 km || 
|-id=634 bgcolor=#d6d6d6
| 546634 ||  || — || November 27, 2010 || Mount Lemmon || Mount Lemmon Survey ||  || align=right | 2.8 km || 
|-id=635 bgcolor=#fefefe
| 546635 ||  || — || November 27, 2010 || Mount Lemmon || Mount Lemmon Survey ||  || align=right data-sort-value="0.90" | 900 m || 
|-id=636 bgcolor=#C2FFFF
| 546636 ||  || — || September 17, 2009 || Kitt Peak || Spacewatch || L4 || align=right | 8.6 km || 
|-id=637 bgcolor=#fefefe
| 546637 ||  || — || November 27, 2010 || Mount Lemmon || Mount Lemmon Survey ||  || align=right data-sort-value="0.52" | 520 m || 
|-id=638 bgcolor=#fefefe
| 546638 ||  || — || August 31, 2006 || Needville || P. Garossino ||  || align=right data-sort-value="0.67" | 670 m || 
|-id=639 bgcolor=#d6d6d6
| 546639 ||  || — || November 11, 2010 || Mount Lemmon || Mount Lemmon Survey ||  || align=right | 2.9 km || 
|-id=640 bgcolor=#fefefe
| 546640 ||  || — || November 13, 2010 || Kitt Peak || Spacewatch ||  || align=right data-sort-value="0.77" | 770 m || 
|-id=641 bgcolor=#d6d6d6
| 546641 ||  || — || November 13, 2010 || Kitt Peak || Spacewatch ||  || align=right | 2.6 km || 
|-id=642 bgcolor=#d6d6d6
| 546642 ||  || — || November 11, 2010 || Mount Lemmon || Mount Lemmon Survey ||  || align=right | 3.0 km || 
|-id=643 bgcolor=#d6d6d6
| 546643 ||  || — || May 5, 2008 || Mount Lemmon || Mount Lemmon Survey ||  || align=right | 3.0 km || 
|-id=644 bgcolor=#d6d6d6
| 546644 ||  || — || November 27, 2010 || Mount Lemmon || Mount Lemmon Survey ||  || align=right | 2.4 km || 
|-id=645 bgcolor=#d6d6d6
| 546645 ||  || — || November 27, 2010 || Mount Lemmon || Mount Lemmon Survey ||  || align=right | 2.9 km || 
|-id=646 bgcolor=#fefefe
| 546646 ||  || — || September 18, 2006 || Kitt Peak || Spacewatch ||  || align=right data-sort-value="0.57" | 570 m || 
|-id=647 bgcolor=#fefefe
| 546647 ||  || — || May 3, 1994 || Kitt Peak || Spacewatch ||  || align=right data-sort-value="0.79" | 790 m || 
|-id=648 bgcolor=#fefefe
| 546648 ||  || — || November 27, 2010 || Mount Lemmon || Mount Lemmon Survey ||  || align=right data-sort-value="0.72" | 720 m || 
|-id=649 bgcolor=#d6d6d6
| 546649 ||  || — || November 12, 2010 || Kitt Peak || Spacewatch ||  || align=right | 2.7 km || 
|-id=650 bgcolor=#d6d6d6
| 546650 ||  || — || November 27, 2010 || Mount Lemmon || Mount Lemmon Survey ||  || align=right | 2.1 km || 
|-id=651 bgcolor=#fefefe
| 546651 ||  || — || October 19, 2006 || Catalina || CSS ||  || align=right data-sort-value="0.98" | 980 m || 
|-id=652 bgcolor=#fefefe
| 546652 ||  || — || November 18, 2003 || Kitt Peak || Spacewatch ||  || align=right data-sort-value="0.63" | 630 m || 
|-id=653 bgcolor=#C2FFFF
| 546653 ||  || — || September 21, 2009 || Kitt Peak || Spacewatch || L4 || align=right | 6.6 km || 
|-id=654 bgcolor=#C2FFFF
| 546654 ||  || — || November 7, 2010 || Kitt Peak || Spacewatch || L4 || align=right | 7.7 km || 
|-id=655 bgcolor=#d6d6d6
| 546655 ||  || — || November 27, 2010 || Mount Lemmon || Mount Lemmon Survey ||  || align=right | 2.7 km || 
|-id=656 bgcolor=#d6d6d6
| 546656 ||  || — || November 12, 2010 || Kitt Peak || Spacewatch ||  || align=right | 2.5 km || 
|-id=657 bgcolor=#fefefe
| 546657 ||  || — || February 11, 2004 || Kitt Peak || Spacewatch ||  || align=right data-sort-value="0.65" | 650 m || 
|-id=658 bgcolor=#d6d6d6
| 546658 ||  || — || November 6, 2010 || Kitt Peak || Spacewatch ||  || align=right | 3.2 km || 
|-id=659 bgcolor=#d6d6d6
| 546659 ||  || — || January 10, 2006 || Mount Lemmon || Mount Lemmon Survey ||  || align=right | 3.0 km || 
|-id=660 bgcolor=#d6d6d6
| 546660 ||  || — || October 10, 2004 || Kitt Peak || L. H. Wasserman, J. R. Lovering ||  || align=right | 1.9 km || 
|-id=661 bgcolor=#d6d6d6
| 546661 ||  || — || March 12, 2007 || Mount Lemmon || Mount Lemmon Survey ||  || align=right | 2.8 km || 
|-id=662 bgcolor=#d6d6d6
| 546662 ||  || — || March 10, 2007 || Mount Lemmon || Mount Lemmon Survey ||  || align=right | 2.5 km || 
|-id=663 bgcolor=#d6d6d6
| 546663 ||  || — || March 11, 2007 || Kitt Peak || Spacewatch ||  || align=right | 3.4 km || 
|-id=664 bgcolor=#d6d6d6
| 546664 ||  || — || February 25, 2007 || Kitt Peak || Spacewatch ||  || align=right | 3.8 km || 
|-id=665 bgcolor=#d6d6d6
| 546665 ||  || — || November 11, 2010 || Kitt Peak || Spacewatch ||  || align=right | 1.9 km || 
|-id=666 bgcolor=#fefefe
| 546666 ||  || — || February 17, 2004 || Kitt Peak || Spacewatch ||  || align=right data-sort-value="0.90" | 900 m || 
|-id=667 bgcolor=#C2FFFF
| 546667 ||  || — || November 8, 2010 || Mount Lemmon || Mount Lemmon Survey || L4 || align=right | 7.7 km || 
|-id=668 bgcolor=#C2FFFF
| 546668 ||  || — || November 8, 2010 || Mount Lemmon || Mount Lemmon Survey || L4 || align=right | 8.5 km || 
|-id=669 bgcolor=#d6d6d6
| 546669 ||  || — || November 6, 2005 || Mount Lemmon || Mount Lemmon Survey ||  || align=right | 3.7 km || 
|-id=670 bgcolor=#d6d6d6
| 546670 ||  || — || November 30, 2010 || Mount Lemmon || Mount Lemmon Survey ||  || align=right | 2.6 km || 
|-id=671 bgcolor=#d6d6d6
| 546671 ||  || — || October 13, 2010 || Mount Lemmon || Mount Lemmon Survey ||  || align=right | 3.4 km || 
|-id=672 bgcolor=#fefefe
| 546672 ||  || — || November 26, 2003 || Kitt Peak || Spacewatch ||  || align=right data-sort-value="0.57" | 570 m || 
|-id=673 bgcolor=#d6d6d6
| 546673 ||  || — || November 5, 2010 || Les Engarouines || L. Bernasconi ||  || align=right | 2.4 km || 
|-id=674 bgcolor=#d6d6d6
| 546674 ||  || — || May 13, 2007 || Kitt Peak || Spacewatch ||  || align=right | 2.7 km || 
|-id=675 bgcolor=#d6d6d6
| 546675 ||  || — || November 28, 2010 || Mount Lemmon || Mount Lemmon Survey ||  || align=right | 2.8 km || 
|-id=676 bgcolor=#fefefe
| 546676 ||  || — || August 20, 2006 || Palomar || NEAT ||  || align=right data-sort-value="0.73" | 730 m || 
|-id=677 bgcolor=#d6d6d6
| 546677 ||  || — || November 28, 2010 || Mount Lemmon || Mount Lemmon Survey ||  || align=right | 2.8 km || 
|-id=678 bgcolor=#d6d6d6
| 546678 ||  || — || October 5, 2004 || Palomar || NEAT ||  || align=right | 3.4 km || 
|-id=679 bgcolor=#d6d6d6
| 546679 ||  || — || September 17, 2004 || Kitt Peak || Spacewatch ||  || align=right | 2.6 km || 
|-id=680 bgcolor=#d6d6d6
| 546680 ||  || — || October 28, 2010 || Mount Lemmon || Mount Lemmon Survey ||  || align=right | 2.6 km || 
|-id=681 bgcolor=#d6d6d6
| 546681 ||  || — || November 28, 2010 || Mount Lemmon || Mount Lemmon Survey ||  || align=right | 3.3 km || 
|-id=682 bgcolor=#d6d6d6
| 546682 ||  || — || December 1, 2005 || Mount Lemmon || Mount Lemmon Survey ||  || align=right | 2.5 km || 
|-id=683 bgcolor=#d6d6d6
| 546683 ||  || — || November 12, 2010 || Kitt Peak || Spacewatch ||  || align=right | 2.9 km || 
|-id=684 bgcolor=#fefefe
| 546684 ||  || — || November 30, 2010 || Mount Lemmon || Mount Lemmon Survey ||  || align=right data-sort-value="0.74" | 740 m || 
|-id=685 bgcolor=#d6d6d6
| 546685 ||  || — || March 31, 2008 || Mount Lemmon || Mount Lemmon Survey ||  || align=right | 3.3 km || 
|-id=686 bgcolor=#d6d6d6
| 546686 ||  || — || November 27, 2010 || Mount Lemmon || Mount Lemmon Survey ||  || align=right | 3.1 km || 
|-id=687 bgcolor=#d6d6d6
| 546687 ||  || — || November 1, 2015 || Haleakala || Pan-STARRS ||  || align=right | 3.7 km || 
|-id=688 bgcolor=#d6d6d6
| 546688 ||  || — || November 30, 2010 || Mount Lemmon || Mount Lemmon Survey ||  || align=right | 2.7 km || 
|-id=689 bgcolor=#C2FFFF
| 546689 ||  || — || January 4, 2013 || Kitt Peak || Spacewatch || L4 || align=right | 7.9 km || 
|-id=690 bgcolor=#C2FFFF
| 546690 ||  || — || November 27, 2010 || Mount Lemmon || Mount Lemmon Survey || L4 || align=right | 7.9 km || 
|-id=691 bgcolor=#C2FFFF
| 546691 ||  || — || November 27, 2010 || Mount Lemmon || Mount Lemmon Survey || L4 || align=right | 6.6 km || 
|-id=692 bgcolor=#C2FFFF
| 546692 ||  || — || January 18, 2013 || Mount Lemmon || Mount Lemmon Survey || L4 || align=right | 6.5 km || 
|-id=693 bgcolor=#C2FFFF
| 546693 ||  || — || November 17, 2010 || Kitt Peak || Spacewatch || L4 || align=right | 9.0 km || 
|-id=694 bgcolor=#d6d6d6
| 546694 ||  || — || December 1, 2010 || Mount Lemmon || Mount Lemmon Survey ||  || align=right | 2.2 km || 
|-id=695 bgcolor=#d6d6d6
| 546695 ||  || — || November 8, 2010 || Kitt Peak || Spacewatch ||  || align=right | 2.9 km || 
|-id=696 bgcolor=#fefefe
| 546696 ||  || — || October 19, 2006 || Mount Lemmon || Mount Lemmon Survey ||  || align=right data-sort-value="0.94" | 940 m || 
|-id=697 bgcolor=#d6d6d6
| 546697 ||  || — || October 17, 2010 || Catalina || CSS ||  || align=right | 3.2 km || 
|-id=698 bgcolor=#d6d6d6
| 546698 ||  || — || November 1, 2010 || Kitt Peak || Spacewatch ||  || align=right | 2.8 km || 
|-id=699 bgcolor=#d6d6d6
| 546699 ||  || — || November 12, 2010 || Mount Lemmon || Mount Lemmon Survey ||  || align=right | 2.2 km || 
|-id=700 bgcolor=#fefefe
| 546700 ||  || — || September 17, 2006 || Kitt Peak || Spacewatch ||  || align=right data-sort-value="0.76" | 760 m || 
|}

546701–546800 

|-bgcolor=#d6d6d6
| 546701 ||  || — || November 4, 2004 || Socorro || LINEAR || EUP || align=right | 4.6 km || 
|-id=702 bgcolor=#fefefe
| 546702 ||  || — || November 13, 2010 || Mount Lemmon || Mount Lemmon Survey ||  || align=right data-sort-value="0.66" | 660 m || 
|-id=703 bgcolor=#fefefe
| 546703 ||  || — || December 19, 2003 || Socorro || LINEAR ||  || align=right data-sort-value="0.72" | 720 m || 
|-id=704 bgcolor=#fefefe
| 546704 ||  || — || December 2, 2010 || Kitt Peak || Spacewatch ||  || align=right data-sort-value="0.80" | 800 m || 
|-id=705 bgcolor=#d6d6d6
| 546705 ||  || — || November 11, 2010 || Mount Lemmon || Mount Lemmon Survey ||  || align=right | 2.1 km || 
|-id=706 bgcolor=#d6d6d6
| 546706 ||  || — || December 2, 2010 || Kitt Peak || Spacewatch ||  || align=right | 3.5 km || 
|-id=707 bgcolor=#d6d6d6
| 546707 ||  || — || December 2, 2010 || Kitt Peak || Spacewatch ||  || align=right | 3.0 km || 
|-id=708 bgcolor=#fefefe
| 546708 ||  || — || December 2, 2010 || Kitt Peak || Spacewatch ||  || align=right | 1.1 km || 
|-id=709 bgcolor=#fefefe
| 546709 ||  || — || March 4, 2005 || Mount Lemmon || Mount Lemmon Survey ||  || align=right data-sort-value="0.72" | 720 m || 
|-id=710 bgcolor=#d6d6d6
| 546710 ||  || — || September 5, 2010 || Mount Lemmon || Mount Lemmon Survey ||  || align=right | 2.9 km || 
|-id=711 bgcolor=#fefefe
| 546711 ||  || — || December 1, 2010 || Mount Lemmon || Mount Lemmon Survey || H || align=right data-sort-value="0.52" | 520 m || 
|-id=712 bgcolor=#fefefe
| 546712 ||  || — || September 19, 2003 || Palomar || NEAT ||  || align=right data-sort-value="0.94" | 940 m || 
|-id=713 bgcolor=#d6d6d6
| 546713 ||  || — || December 2, 2010 || Catalina || CSS ||  || align=right | 3.0 km || 
|-id=714 bgcolor=#d6d6d6
| 546714 ||  || — || November 1, 2010 || Kitt Peak || Spacewatch ||  || align=right | 1.8 km || 
|-id=715 bgcolor=#C2FFFF
| 546715 ||  || — || November 4, 2010 || Mayhill-ISON || L. Elenin || L4 || align=right | 11 km || 
|-id=716 bgcolor=#d6d6d6
| 546716 ||  || — || December 1, 2010 || Mount Lemmon || Mount Lemmon Survey ||  || align=right | 2.3 km || 
|-id=717 bgcolor=#d6d6d6
| 546717 ||  || — || December 1, 2010 || Mount Lemmon || Mount Lemmon Survey ||  || align=right | 2.2 km || 
|-id=718 bgcolor=#d6d6d6
| 546718 ||  || — || December 1, 2010 || Mount Lemmon || Mount Lemmon Survey ||  || align=right | 2.1 km || 
|-id=719 bgcolor=#fefefe
| 546719 ||  || — || October 10, 2002 || Apache Point || SDSS Collaboration ||  || align=right data-sort-value="0.72" | 720 m || 
|-id=720 bgcolor=#d6d6d6
| 546720 ||  || — || May 4, 2002 || Palomar || NEAT ||  || align=right | 3.2 km || 
|-id=721 bgcolor=#fefefe
| 546721 ||  || — || December 2, 2010 || Mount Lemmon || Mount Lemmon Survey ||  || align=right data-sort-value="0.69" | 690 m || 
|-id=722 bgcolor=#d6d6d6
| 546722 ||  || — || April 6, 2008 || Mount Lemmon || Mount Lemmon Survey ||  || align=right | 3.2 km || 
|-id=723 bgcolor=#d6d6d6
| 546723 ||  || — || October 7, 2004 || Palomar || NEAT ||  || align=right | 4.2 km || 
|-id=724 bgcolor=#d6d6d6
| 546724 ||  || — || December 3, 2010 || Mount Lemmon || Mount Lemmon Survey ||  || align=right | 3.7 km || 
|-id=725 bgcolor=#d6d6d6
| 546725 ||  || — || January 27, 2006 || Kitt Peak || Spacewatch ||  || align=right | 2.7 km || 
|-id=726 bgcolor=#d6d6d6
| 546726 ||  || — || December 6, 2010 || Mount Lemmon || Mount Lemmon Survey ||  || align=right | 2.9 km || 
|-id=727 bgcolor=#d6d6d6
| 546727 ||  || — || October 30, 2010 || Kitt Peak || Spacewatch ||  || align=right | 3.2 km || 
|-id=728 bgcolor=#E9E9E9
| 546728 ||  || — || October 31, 2005 || Catalina || CSS ||  || align=right | 3.0 km || 
|-id=729 bgcolor=#fefefe
| 546729 ||  || — || October 19, 2006 || Kitt Peak || Spacewatch ||  || align=right data-sort-value="0.63" | 630 m || 
|-id=730 bgcolor=#d6d6d6
| 546730 ||  || — || December 4, 2010 || Mount Lemmon || Mount Lemmon Survey ||  || align=right | 3.0 km || 
|-id=731 bgcolor=#d6d6d6
| 546731 ||  || — || December 4, 2010 || Mount Lemmon || Mount Lemmon Survey ||  || align=right | 2.3 km || 
|-id=732 bgcolor=#d6d6d6
| 546732 ||  || — || December 4, 2010 || Kislovodsk Mtn. || E. S. Romas ||  || align=right | 2.6 km || 
|-id=733 bgcolor=#d6d6d6
| 546733 ||  || — || November 1, 2010 || Mount Lemmon || Mount Lemmon Survey ||  || align=right | 2.3 km || 
|-id=734 bgcolor=#fefefe
| 546734 ||  || — || November 23, 2003 || Kitt Peak || Spacewatch ||  || align=right data-sort-value="0.64" | 640 m || 
|-id=735 bgcolor=#fefefe
| 546735 ||  || — || November 10, 2010 || Mount Lemmon || Mount Lemmon Survey ||  || align=right | 1.2 km || 
|-id=736 bgcolor=#d6d6d6
| 546736 ||  || — || November 11, 2010 || Mount Lemmon || Mount Lemmon Survey ||  || align=right | 2.8 km || 
|-id=737 bgcolor=#d6d6d6
| 546737 ||  || — || October 13, 2010 || Mount Lemmon || Mount Lemmon Survey ||  || align=right | 2.7 km || 
|-id=738 bgcolor=#fefefe
| 546738 ||  || — || November 5, 2010 || Kitt Peak || Spacewatch ||  || align=right data-sort-value="0.57" | 570 m || 
|-id=739 bgcolor=#d6d6d6
| 546739 ||  || — || November 11, 2010 || Mount Lemmon || Mount Lemmon Survey ||  || align=right | 2.3 km || 
|-id=740 bgcolor=#d6d6d6
| 546740 ||  || — || December 6, 2010 || Mount Lemmon || Mount Lemmon Survey ||  || align=right | 3.5 km || 
|-id=741 bgcolor=#d6d6d6
| 546741 ||  || — || December 8, 2010 || Kitt Peak || Spacewatch ||  || align=right | 2.5 km || 
|-id=742 bgcolor=#d6d6d6
| 546742 ||  || — || November 7, 2005 || Mauna Kea || Mauna Kea Obs. ||  || align=right | 2.6 km || 
|-id=743 bgcolor=#C2FFFF
| 546743 ||  || — || December 8, 2010 || Kitt Peak || Spacewatch || L4 || align=right | 6.6 km || 
|-id=744 bgcolor=#d6d6d6
| 546744 ||  || — || July 28, 2008 || Mount Lemmon || Mount Lemmon Survey ||  || align=right | 3.5 km || 
|-id=745 bgcolor=#d6d6d6
| 546745 ||  || — || April 1, 2008 || Kitt Peak || Spacewatch ||  || align=right | 2.6 km || 
|-id=746 bgcolor=#fefefe
| 546746 ||  || — || July 18, 2009 || Sandlot || G. Hug ||  || align=right data-sort-value="0.82" | 820 m || 
|-id=747 bgcolor=#d6d6d6
| 546747 ||  || — || September 25, 2009 || Catalina || CSS ||  || align=right | 3.5 km || 
|-id=748 bgcolor=#d6d6d6
| 546748 ||  || — || November 15, 2010 || Catalina || CSS ||  || align=right | 2.5 km || 
|-id=749 bgcolor=#d6d6d6
| 546749 ||  || — || December 10, 2010 || Mount Lemmon || Mount Lemmon Survey ||  || align=right | 2.9 km || 
|-id=750 bgcolor=#d6d6d6
| 546750 ||  || — || October 14, 2010 || Mount Lemmon || Mount Lemmon Survey ||  || align=right | 3.8 km || 
|-id=751 bgcolor=#d6d6d6
| 546751 ||  || — || December 10, 2010 || Bisei SG Center || A. Asami, T. Sakamoto ||  || align=right | 2.5 km || 
|-id=752 bgcolor=#C2FFFF
| 546752 ||  || — || November 14, 2010 || Mount Lemmon || Mount Lemmon Survey || L4ERY || align=right | 7.2 km || 
|-id=753 bgcolor=#d6d6d6
| 546753 ||  || — || June 1, 2002 || Socorro || LINEAR ||  || align=right | 3.6 km || 
|-id=754 bgcolor=#d6d6d6
| 546754 ||  || — || December 14, 2010 || Mount Lemmon || Mount Lemmon Survey ||  || align=right | 3.5 km || 
|-id=755 bgcolor=#d6d6d6
| 546755 ||  || — || December 10, 2005 || Kitt Peak || Spacewatch ||  || align=right | 3.3 km || 
|-id=756 bgcolor=#E9E9E9
| 546756 Sunguoyou ||  ||  || December 9, 2010 || Xingming || Z. Xu, X. Gao ||  || align=right data-sort-value="0.99" | 990 m || 
|-id=757 bgcolor=#d6d6d6
| 546757 ||  || — || December 14, 2010 || Mount Lemmon || Mount Lemmon Survey ||  || align=right | 4.0 km || 
|-id=758 bgcolor=#d6d6d6
| 546758 ||  || — || July 31, 2009 || Kitt Peak || Spacewatch ||  || align=right | 2.7 km || 
|-id=759 bgcolor=#fefefe
| 546759 ||  || — || November 13, 2010 || Mount Lemmon || Mount Lemmon Survey ||  || align=right data-sort-value="0.80" | 800 m || 
|-id=760 bgcolor=#C2FFFF
| 546760 ||  || — || September 22, 2009 || Mount Lemmon || Mount Lemmon Survey || L4 || align=right | 8.5 km || 
|-id=761 bgcolor=#fefefe
| 546761 ||  || — || September 19, 2006 || Catalina || CSS ||  || align=right data-sort-value="0.97" | 970 m || 
|-id=762 bgcolor=#fefefe
| 546762 ||  || — || December 3, 2010 || Mount Lemmon || Mount Lemmon Survey ||  || align=right data-sort-value="0.66" | 660 m || 
|-id=763 bgcolor=#d6d6d6
| 546763 ||  || — || December 4, 2010 || Mount Lemmon || Mount Lemmon Survey ||  || align=right | 3.9 km || 
|-id=764 bgcolor=#d6d6d6
| 546764 ||  || — || January 4, 2000 || Kitt Peak || Spacewatch ||  || align=right | 3.7 km || 
|-id=765 bgcolor=#d6d6d6
| 546765 ||  || — || September 16, 2009 || Mount Lemmon || Mount Lemmon Survey ||  || align=right | 3.0 km || 
|-id=766 bgcolor=#d6d6d6
| 546766 ||  || — || November 12, 2010 || Mount Lemmon || Mount Lemmon Survey ||  || align=right | 2.9 km || 
|-id=767 bgcolor=#E9E9E9
| 546767 ||  || — || September 1, 2005 || Palomar || NEAT || EUN || align=right | 1.5 km || 
|-id=768 bgcolor=#d6d6d6
| 546768 ||  || — || December 6, 2010 || Mount Lemmon || Mount Lemmon Survey ||  || align=right | 2.6 km || 
|-id=769 bgcolor=#d6d6d6
| 546769 ||  || — || May 8, 2008 || Mount Lemmon || Mount Lemmon Survey ||  || align=right | 3.1 km || 
|-id=770 bgcolor=#d6d6d6
| 546770 ||  || — || December 2, 2010 || Mount Lemmon || Mount Lemmon Survey ||  || align=right | 3.1 km || 
|-id=771 bgcolor=#d6d6d6
| 546771 ||  || — || December 9, 2010 || Catalina || CSS ||  || align=right | 4.5 km || 
|-id=772 bgcolor=#d6d6d6
| 546772 ||  || — || December 4, 2010 || Mount Lemmon || Mount Lemmon Survey ||  || align=right | 3.1 km || 
|-id=773 bgcolor=#d6d6d6
| 546773 ||  || — || December 6, 2010 || Mount Lemmon || Mount Lemmon Survey ||  || align=right | 3.1 km || 
|-id=774 bgcolor=#fefefe
| 546774 ||  || — || August 26, 2006 || Lulin || LUSS ||  || align=right data-sort-value="0.91" | 910 m || 
|-id=775 bgcolor=#d6d6d6
| 546775 ||  || — || December 13, 2004 || Kitt Peak || Spacewatch ||  || align=right | 3.1 km || 
|-id=776 bgcolor=#d6d6d6
| 546776 ||  || — || December 15, 2010 || Mount Lemmon || Mount Lemmon Survey ||  || align=right | 3.5 km || 
|-id=777 bgcolor=#C2FFFF
| 546777 ||  || — || November 6, 2010 || Mount Lemmon || Mount Lemmon Survey || L4 || align=right | 6.7 km || 
|-id=778 bgcolor=#C2FFFF
| 546778 ||  || — || November 10, 2010 || Mount Lemmon || Mount Lemmon Survey || L4 || align=right | 7.7 km || 
|-id=779 bgcolor=#C2FFFF
| 546779 ||  || — || January 14, 2012 || Mount Lemmon || Mount Lemmon Survey || L4 || align=right | 7.4 km || 
|-id=780 bgcolor=#C2FFFF
| 546780 ||  || — || February 9, 2013 || Haleakala || Pan-STARRS || L4 || align=right | 8.1 km || 
|-id=781 bgcolor=#C2FFFF
| 546781 ||  || — || November 30, 2010 || Mount Lemmon || Mount Lemmon Survey || L4 || align=right | 11 km || 
|-id=782 bgcolor=#d6d6d6
| 546782 ||  || — || November 6, 2010 || Kitt Peak || Spacewatch ||  || align=right | 2.6 km || 
|-id=783 bgcolor=#d6d6d6
| 546783 ||  || — || September 20, 2003 || Kitt Peak || Spacewatch ||  || align=right | 2.7 km || 
|-id=784 bgcolor=#fefefe
| 546784 ||  || — || December 8, 2010 || Kitt Peak || Spacewatch ||  || align=right data-sort-value="0.81" | 810 m || 
|-id=785 bgcolor=#d6d6d6
| 546785 ||  || — || December 13, 2010 || Mount Lemmon || Mount Lemmon Survey ||  || align=right | 2.3 km || 
|-id=786 bgcolor=#d6d6d6
| 546786 ||  || — || April 11, 2013 || Kitt Peak || Spacewatch ||  || align=right | 3.0 km || 
|-id=787 bgcolor=#d6d6d6
| 546787 ||  || — || June 7, 2013 || Haleakala || Pan-STARRS ||  || align=right | 2.6 km || 
|-id=788 bgcolor=#d6d6d6
| 546788 ||  || — || March 27, 2012 || Haleakala || Pan-STARRS ||  || align=right | 2.6 km || 
|-id=789 bgcolor=#E9E9E9
| 546789 ||  || — || September 25, 2014 || Mount Lemmon || Mount Lemmon Survey ||  || align=right data-sort-value="0.81" | 810 m || 
|-id=790 bgcolor=#d6d6d6
| 546790 ||  || — || November 6, 2010 || Kitt Peak || Spacewatch ||  || align=right | 3.5 km || 
|-id=791 bgcolor=#fefefe
| 546791 ||  || — || December 2, 2010 || Mount Lemmon || Mount Lemmon Survey ||  || align=right data-sort-value="0.57" | 570 m || 
|-id=792 bgcolor=#d6d6d6
| 546792 ||  || — || December 14, 2010 || Mount Lemmon || Mount Lemmon Survey ||  || align=right | 2.8 km || 
|-id=793 bgcolor=#fefefe
| 546793 ||  || — || January 15, 2015 || Haleakala || Pan-STARRS ||  || align=right data-sort-value="0.58" | 580 m || 
|-id=794 bgcolor=#d6d6d6
| 546794 ||  || — || April 10, 2013 || Haleakala || Pan-STARRS ||  || align=right | 2.2 km || 
|-id=795 bgcolor=#d6d6d6
| 546795 ||  || — || December 3, 2015 || Mount Lemmon || Mount Lemmon Survey ||  || align=right | 3.1 km || 
|-id=796 bgcolor=#fefefe
| 546796 ||  || — || October 2, 2013 || Haleakala || Pan-STARRS ||  || align=right data-sort-value="0.67" | 670 m || 
|-id=797 bgcolor=#fefefe
| 546797 ||  || — || December 2, 2010 || Catalina || CSS ||  || align=right data-sort-value="0.72" | 720 m || 
|-id=798 bgcolor=#d6d6d6
| 546798 ||  || — || January 27, 2012 || Mount Lemmon || Mount Lemmon Survey ||  || align=right | 2.1 km || 
|-id=799 bgcolor=#d6d6d6
| 546799 ||  || — || December 1, 2005 || Mount Lemmon || Mount Lemmon Survey ||  || align=right | 2.9 km || 
|-id=800 bgcolor=#d6d6d6
| 546800 ||  || — || November 21, 2015 || Mount Lemmon || Mount Lemmon Survey ||  || align=right | 2.2 km || 
|}

546801–546900 

|-bgcolor=#d6d6d6
| 546801 ||  || — || September 23, 2015 || Haleakala || Pan-STARRS ||  || align=right | 3.4 km || 
|-id=802 bgcolor=#d6d6d6
| 546802 ||  || — || May 30, 2013 || Mount Lemmon || Mount Lemmon Survey ||  || align=right | 2.1 km || 
|-id=803 bgcolor=#d6d6d6
| 546803 ||  || — || December 3, 2010 || Mount Lemmon || Mount Lemmon Survey ||  || align=right | 2.2 km || 
|-id=804 bgcolor=#d6d6d6
| 546804 ||  || — || September 23, 2015 || Haleakala || Pan-STARRS ||  || align=right | 2.7 km || 
|-id=805 bgcolor=#d6d6d6
| 546805 ||  || — || November 5, 2010 || Kitt Peak || Spacewatch ||  || align=right | 2.5 km || 
|-id=806 bgcolor=#d6d6d6
| 546806 ||  || — || May 19, 2013 || Kitt Peak || Spacewatch ||  || align=right | 2.7 km || 
|-id=807 bgcolor=#d6d6d6
| 546807 ||  || — || October 3, 2015 || Mount Lemmon || Mount Lemmon Survey ||  || align=right | 2.6 km || 
|-id=808 bgcolor=#C2FFFF
| 546808 ||  || — || April 10, 2016 || Haleakala || Pan-STARRS || L4 || align=right | 7.6 km || 
|-id=809 bgcolor=#d6d6d6
| 546809 ||  || — || December 13, 2010 || Mount Lemmon || Mount Lemmon Survey ||  || align=right | 3.1 km || 
|-id=810 bgcolor=#d6d6d6
| 546810 ||  || — || December 2, 2010 || Mount Lemmon || Mount Lemmon Survey ||  || align=right | 2.9 km || 
|-id=811 bgcolor=#fefefe
| 546811 ||  || — || December 3, 2010 || Mount Lemmon || Mount Lemmon Survey ||  || align=right data-sort-value="0.65" | 650 m || 
|-id=812 bgcolor=#fefefe
| 546812 ||  || — || December 1, 2010 || Mount Lemmon || Mount Lemmon Survey ||  || align=right data-sort-value="0.67" | 670 m || 
|-id=813 bgcolor=#d6d6d6
| 546813 ||  || — || December 8, 2010 || Mount Lemmon || Mount Lemmon Survey ||  || align=right | 3.4 km || 
|-id=814 bgcolor=#d6d6d6
| 546814 ||  || — || December 2, 2010 || Mount Lemmon || Mount Lemmon Survey ||  || align=right | 2.5 km || 
|-id=815 bgcolor=#fefefe
| 546815 ||  || — || December 15, 2010 || Mount Lemmon || Mount Lemmon Survey ||  || align=right data-sort-value="0.87" | 870 m || 
|-id=816 bgcolor=#d6d6d6
| 546816 ||  || — || October 22, 2015 || Haleakala || Pan-STARRS ||  || align=right | 2.7 km || 
|-id=817 bgcolor=#fefefe
| 546817 ||  || — || May 4, 1994 || Kitt Peak || Spacewatch ||  || align=right data-sort-value="0.74" | 740 m || 
|-id=818 bgcolor=#C2FFFF
| 546818 ||  || — || December 14, 2010 || Mount Lemmon || Mount Lemmon Survey || L4 || align=right | 8.2 km || 
|-id=819 bgcolor=#d6d6d6
| 546819 ||  || — || January 2, 2017 || Haleakala || Pan-STARRS ||  || align=right | 2.2 km || 
|-id=820 bgcolor=#C2FFFF
| 546820 ||  || — || December 5, 2010 || Mount Lemmon || Mount Lemmon Survey || L4 || align=right | 8.9 km || 
|-id=821 bgcolor=#d6d6d6
| 546821 ||  || — || February 24, 2012 || Mount Lemmon || Mount Lemmon Survey ||  || align=right | 2.1 km || 
|-id=822 bgcolor=#d6d6d6
| 546822 ||  || — || December 13, 2010 || Mauna Kea || L. Wells, M. Micheli ||  || align=right | 2.0 km || 
|-id=823 bgcolor=#d6d6d6
| 546823 ||  || — || May 8, 2013 || Haleakala || Pan-STARRS ||  || align=right | 2.4 km || 
|-id=824 bgcolor=#fefefe
| 546824 ||  || — || November 21, 2003 || Socorro || LINEAR ||  || align=right data-sort-value="0.70" | 700 m || 
|-id=825 bgcolor=#C2FFFF
| 546825 ||  || — || December 1, 2010 || Mount Lemmon || Mount Lemmon Survey || L4 || align=right | 6.8 km || 
|-id=826 bgcolor=#C2FFFF
| 546826 ||  || — || December 2, 2010 || Mount Lemmon || Mount Lemmon Survey || L4 || align=right | 6.0 km || 
|-id=827 bgcolor=#C2FFFF
| 546827 ||  || — || December 6, 2010 || Mount Lemmon || Mount Lemmon Survey || L4 || align=right | 6.8 km || 
|-id=828 bgcolor=#d6d6d6
| 546828 ||  || — || December 6, 2010 || Mount Lemmon || Mount Lemmon Survey || 7:4 || align=right | 2.9 km || 
|-id=829 bgcolor=#C2FFFF
| 546829 ||  || — || December 6, 2010 || Mount Lemmon || Mount Lemmon Survey || L4 || align=right | 7.4 km || 
|-id=830 bgcolor=#fefefe
| 546830 ||  || — || December 14, 2010 || Mount Lemmon || Mount Lemmon Survey ||  || align=right data-sort-value="0.70" | 700 m || 
|-id=831 bgcolor=#fefefe
| 546831 ||  || — || December 13, 2010 || Mount Lemmon || Mount Lemmon Survey ||  || align=right data-sort-value="0.67" | 670 m || 
|-id=832 bgcolor=#E9E9E9
| 546832 ||  || — || December 10, 2010 || Mount Lemmon || Mount Lemmon Survey ||  || align=right data-sort-value="0.76" | 760 m || 
|-id=833 bgcolor=#fefefe
| 546833 ||  || — || February 10, 2008 || Mount Lemmon || Mount Lemmon Survey ||  || align=right data-sort-value="0.93" | 930 m || 
|-id=834 bgcolor=#fefefe
| 546834 ||  || — || January 13, 2004 || Anderson Mesa || LONEOS || PHO || align=right data-sort-value="0.86" | 860 m || 
|-id=835 bgcolor=#d6d6d6
| 546835 ||  || — || November 19, 2004 || Anderson Mesa || LONEOS ||  || align=right | 2.9 km || 
|-id=836 bgcolor=#d6d6d6
| 546836 ||  || — || December 30, 2010 || Piszkesteto || Z. Kuli, K. Sárneczky ||  || align=right | 3.8 km || 
|-id=837 bgcolor=#fefefe
| 546837 ||  || — || November 19, 2003 || Palomar || NEAT ||  || align=right data-sort-value="0.73" | 730 m || 
|-id=838 bgcolor=#d6d6d6
| 546838 ||  || — || November 30, 2005 || Mount Lemmon || Mount Lemmon Survey ||  || align=right | 3.1 km || 
|-id=839 bgcolor=#d6d6d6
| 546839 ||  || — || June 2, 2014 || Haleakala || Pan-STARRS ||  || align=right | 2.9 km || 
|-id=840 bgcolor=#C2FFFF
| 546840 ||  || — || December 25, 2010 || Mount Lemmon || Mount Lemmon Survey || L4 || align=right | 7.9 km || 
|-id=841 bgcolor=#d6d6d6
| 546841 ||  || — || September 23, 2015 || Haleakala || Pan-STARRS ||  || align=right | 2.7 km || 
|-id=842 bgcolor=#d6d6d6
| 546842 Ruanjiangao ||  ||  || December 21, 2011 || Xingming || Z. Xu, X. Gao ||  || align=right | 1.9 km || 
|-id=843 bgcolor=#fefefe
| 546843 Xuzhijian ||  ||  || December 27, 2011 || Xingming || Z.-W. Jin, X. Gao ||  || align=right data-sort-value="0.97" | 970 m || 
|-id=844 bgcolor=#d6d6d6
| 546844 Jinzhangwei ||  ||  || September 11, 2016 || Xingming || J. Ruan, X. Gao ||  || align=right | 2.7 km || 
|-id=845 bgcolor=#fefefe
| 546845 Wulumuqiyizhong ||  ||  || December 21, 2011 || Xingming || Z. Xu, X. Gao || H || align=right data-sort-value="0.55" | 550 m || 
|-id=846 bgcolor=#E9E9E9
| 546846 Sunpeiyuan ||  ||  || January 9, 2011 || Xingming || Z. Xu, X. Gao ||  || align=right | 1.5 km || 
|-id=847 bgcolor=#d6d6d6
| 546847 ||  || — || January 4, 2010 || Kitt Peak || Spacewatch ||  || align=right | 2.8 km || 
|-id=848 bgcolor=#d6d6d6
| 546848 ||  || — || December 18, 2009 || Kitt Peak || Spacewatch ||  || align=right | 2.8 km || 
|-id=849 bgcolor=#fefefe
| 546849 ||  || — || January 4, 2010 || Kitt Peak || Spacewatch || H || align=right data-sort-value="0.79" | 790 m || 
|-id=850 bgcolor=#d6d6d6
| 546850 ||  || — || January 16, 2005 || Kitt Peak || Spacewatch || EOS || align=right | 1.8 km || 
|-id=851 bgcolor=#d6d6d6
| 546851 ||  || — || December 17, 2009 || Mount Lemmon || Mount Lemmon Survey ||  || align=right | 2.4 km || 
|-id=852 bgcolor=#fefefe
| 546852 ||  || — || January 6, 2010 || Kitt Peak || Spacewatch || H || align=right data-sort-value="0.61" | 610 m || 
|-id=853 bgcolor=#d6d6d6
| 546853 ||  || — || January 6, 2010 || Catalina || CSS ||  || align=right | 3.4 km || 
|-id=854 bgcolor=#d6d6d6
| 546854 ||  || — || January 6, 2010 || Kitt Peak || Spacewatch ||  || align=right | 3.8 km || 
|-id=855 bgcolor=#d6d6d6
| 546855 ||  || — || January 6, 2010 || Kitt Peak || Spacewatch ||  || align=right | 2.5 km || 
|-id=856 bgcolor=#d6d6d6
| 546856 ||  || — || January 6, 2010 || Mount Lemmon || Mount Lemmon Survey ||  || align=right | 3.6 km || 
|-id=857 bgcolor=#d6d6d6
| 546857 ||  || — || September 23, 2008 || Kitt Peak || Spacewatch ||  || align=right | 2.3 km || 
|-id=858 bgcolor=#d6d6d6
| 546858 ||  || — || January 6, 2010 || Mount Lemmon || Mount Lemmon Survey ||  || align=right | 2.3 km || 
|-id=859 bgcolor=#d6d6d6
| 546859 ||  || — || December 20, 2004 || Mount Lemmon || Mount Lemmon Survey ||  || align=right | 2.5 km || 
|-id=860 bgcolor=#fefefe
| 546860 ||  || — || January 6, 2010 || Kitt Peak || Spacewatch ||  || align=right data-sort-value="0.70" | 700 m || 
|-id=861 bgcolor=#d6d6d6
| 546861 ||  || — || January 6, 2010 || Kitt Peak || Spacewatch ||  || align=right | 2.7 km || 
|-id=862 bgcolor=#d6d6d6
| 546862 ||  || — || January 7, 2010 || Kitt Peak || Spacewatch ||  || align=right | 2.7 km || 
|-id=863 bgcolor=#d6d6d6
| 546863 ||  || — || April 30, 2006 || Kitt Peak || Spacewatch ||  || align=right | 3.2 km || 
|-id=864 bgcolor=#fefefe
| 546864 ||  || — || July 31, 2008 || Mount Lemmon || Mount Lemmon Survey ||  || align=right | 1.0 km || 
|-id=865 bgcolor=#fefefe
| 546865 ||  || — || September 8, 2008 || Dauban || F. Kugel ||  || align=right data-sort-value="0.84" | 840 m || 
|-id=866 bgcolor=#d6d6d6
| 546866 ||  || — || January 16, 2005 || Kitt Peak || Spacewatch ||  || align=right | 3.1 km || 
|-id=867 bgcolor=#d6d6d6
| 546867 ||  || — || January 7, 2010 || Mount Lemmon || Mount Lemmon Survey ||  || align=right | 2.4 km || 
|-id=868 bgcolor=#d6d6d6
| 546868 ||  || — || January 7, 2010 || Kitt Peak || Spacewatch ||  || align=right | 3.3 km || 
|-id=869 bgcolor=#d6d6d6
| 546869 ||  || — || January 7, 2010 || Mount Lemmon || Mount Lemmon Survey ||  || align=right | 2.6 km || 
|-id=870 bgcolor=#d6d6d6
| 546870 ||  || — || January 7, 2010 || Mount Lemmon || Mount Lemmon Survey ||  || align=right | 2.3 km || 
|-id=871 bgcolor=#d6d6d6
| 546871 ||  || — || January 7, 2010 || Kitt Peak || Spacewatch ||  || align=right | 2.3 km || 
|-id=872 bgcolor=#d6d6d6
| 546872 ||  || — || January 7, 2010 || Mount Lemmon || Mount Lemmon Survey ||  || align=right | 2.8 km || 
|-id=873 bgcolor=#d6d6d6
| 546873 ||  || — || May 9, 2006 || Mount Lemmon || Mount Lemmon Survey ||  || align=right | 3.5 km || 
|-id=874 bgcolor=#d6d6d6
| 546874 ||  || — || January 6, 2010 || Kitt Peak || Spacewatch ||  || align=right | 2.7 km || 
|-id=875 bgcolor=#fefefe
| 546875 ||  || — || April 8, 2003 || Kitt Peak || Spacewatch ||  || align=right data-sort-value="0.66" | 660 m || 
|-id=876 bgcolor=#fefefe
| 546876 ||  || — || December 25, 2005 || Mount Lemmon || Mount Lemmon Survey ||  || align=right data-sort-value="0.78" | 780 m || 
|-id=877 bgcolor=#fefefe
| 546877 ||  || — || November 17, 2009 || Mount Lemmon || Mount Lemmon Survey ||  || align=right data-sort-value="0.72" | 720 m || 
|-id=878 bgcolor=#d6d6d6
| 546878 ||  || — || January 6, 2010 || Kitt Peak || Spacewatch ||  || align=right | 3.3 km || 
|-id=879 bgcolor=#d6d6d6
| 546879 ||  || — || January 6, 2010 || Kitt Peak || Spacewatch ||  || align=right | 2.9 km || 
|-id=880 bgcolor=#d6d6d6
| 546880 ||  || — || January 6, 2010 || Kitt Peak || Spacewatch ||  || align=right | 3.0 km || 
|-id=881 bgcolor=#fefefe
| 546881 ||  || — || January 6, 2010 || Kitt Peak || Spacewatch ||  || align=right data-sort-value="0.78" | 780 m || 
|-id=882 bgcolor=#d6d6d6
| 546882 ||  || — || January 8, 2010 || Mount Lemmon || Mount Lemmon Survey ||  || align=right | 2.7 km || 
|-id=883 bgcolor=#d6d6d6
| 546883 ||  || — || December 18, 2009 || Mount Lemmon || Mount Lemmon Survey ||  || align=right | 2.9 km || 
|-id=884 bgcolor=#d6d6d6
| 546884 ||  || — || January 6, 2010 || Kitt Peak || Spacewatch ||  || align=right | 3.2 km || 
|-id=885 bgcolor=#d6d6d6
| 546885 ||  || — || January 6, 2010 || Kitt Peak || Spacewatch ||  || align=right | 2.7 km || 
|-id=886 bgcolor=#d6d6d6
| 546886 ||  || — || June 21, 2007 || Mount Lemmon || Mount Lemmon Survey ||  || align=right | 3.0 km || 
|-id=887 bgcolor=#d6d6d6
| 546887 ||  || — || January 7, 2010 || Kitt Peak || Spacewatch ||  || align=right | 3.2 km || 
|-id=888 bgcolor=#d6d6d6
| 546888 ||  || — || November 1, 2008 || Mount Lemmon || Mount Lemmon Survey ||  || align=right | 3.0 km || 
|-id=889 bgcolor=#d6d6d6
| 546889 ||  || — || March 13, 2005 || Kitt Peak || Spacewatch ||  || align=right | 2.4 km || 
|-id=890 bgcolor=#d6d6d6
| 546890 ||  || — || January 7, 2010 || Kitt Peak || Spacewatch ||  || align=right | 2.6 km || 
|-id=891 bgcolor=#d6d6d6
| 546891 ||  || — || January 8, 2010 || Kitt Peak || Spacewatch ||  || align=right | 2.7 km || 
|-id=892 bgcolor=#d6d6d6
| 546892 ||  || — || October 27, 2009 || Mount Lemmon || Mount Lemmon Survey ||  || align=right | 2.8 km || 
|-id=893 bgcolor=#d6d6d6
| 546893 ||  || — || January 10, 2010 || Kitt Peak || Spacewatch ||  || align=right | 3.5 km || 
|-id=894 bgcolor=#d6d6d6
| 546894 ||  || — || January 8, 2010 || Mount Lemmon || Mount Lemmon Survey || TIR || align=right | 2.5 km || 
|-id=895 bgcolor=#d6d6d6
| 546895 ||  || — || January 5, 2010 || Kitt Peak || Spacewatch ||  || align=right | 3.9 km || 
|-id=896 bgcolor=#d6d6d6
| 546896 ||  || — || January 6, 2010 || Kitt Peak || Spacewatch ||  || align=right | 2.4 km || 
|-id=897 bgcolor=#d6d6d6
| 546897 ||  || — || February 14, 2005 || Kitt Peak || Spacewatch ||  || align=right | 2.2 km || 
|-id=898 bgcolor=#d6d6d6
| 546898 ||  || — || January 6, 2010 || Mount Lemmon || Mount Lemmon Survey ||  || align=right | 3.2 km || 
|-id=899 bgcolor=#d6d6d6
| 546899 ||  || — || January 6, 2010 || Catalina || CSS || Tj (2.94) || align=right | 3.3 km || 
|-id=900 bgcolor=#d6d6d6
| 546900 ||  || — || December 1, 2008 || Mount Lemmon || Mount Lemmon Survey ||  || align=right | 2.6 km || 
|}

546901–547000 

|-bgcolor=#d6d6d6
| 546901 ||  || — || January 7, 2010 || Mount Lemmon || Mount Lemmon Survey ||  || align=right | 2.7 km || 
|-id=902 bgcolor=#d6d6d6
| 546902 ||  || — || February 4, 2005 || Kitt Peak || Spacewatch ||  || align=right | 2.4 km || 
|-id=903 bgcolor=#d6d6d6
| 546903 ||  || — || January 7, 2010 || Mount Lemmon || Mount Lemmon Survey ||  || align=right | 2.0 km || 
|-id=904 bgcolor=#d6d6d6
| 546904 ||  || — || December 18, 2009 || Mount Lemmon || Mount Lemmon Survey ||  || align=right | 2.0 km || 
|-id=905 bgcolor=#fefefe
| 546905 ||  || — || January 7, 2010 || Mount Lemmon || Mount Lemmon Survey ||  || align=right data-sort-value="0.82" | 820 m || 
|-id=906 bgcolor=#d6d6d6
| 546906 ||  || — || October 21, 2008 || Kitt Peak || Spacewatch ||  || align=right | 4.0 km || 
|-id=907 bgcolor=#d6d6d6
| 546907 ||  || — || January 8, 2010 || Kitt Peak || Spacewatch ||  || align=right | 2.5 km || 
|-id=908 bgcolor=#fefefe
| 546908 ||  || — || March 10, 2003 || Palomar || NEAT ||  || align=right data-sort-value="0.94" | 940 m || 
|-id=909 bgcolor=#fefefe
| 546909 ||  || — || November 16, 2009 || Mount Lemmon || Mount Lemmon Survey ||  || align=right data-sort-value="0.99" | 990 m || 
|-id=910 bgcolor=#d6d6d6
| 546910 ||  || — || December 27, 2009 || Kitt Peak || Spacewatch ||  || align=right | 2.8 km || 
|-id=911 bgcolor=#d6d6d6
| 546911 ||  || — || January 8, 2010 || Mount Lemmon || Mount Lemmon Survey ||  || align=right | 2.3 km || 
|-id=912 bgcolor=#d6d6d6
| 546912 ||  || — || January 8, 2010 || Kitt Peak || Spacewatch ||  || align=right | 2.3 km || 
|-id=913 bgcolor=#d6d6d6
| 546913 ||  || — || January 8, 2010 || Mount Lemmon || Mount Lemmon Survey ||  || align=right | 2.6 km || 
|-id=914 bgcolor=#fefefe
| 546914 ||  || — || August 29, 2005 || Palomar || NEAT ||  || align=right data-sort-value="0.73" | 730 m || 
|-id=915 bgcolor=#d6d6d6
| 546915 ||  || — || December 17, 2009 || Kitt Peak || Spacewatch ||  || align=right | 2.8 km || 
|-id=916 bgcolor=#d6d6d6
| 546916 ||  || — || January 11, 2010 || Mount Lemmon || Mount Lemmon Survey ||  || align=right | 2.2 km || 
|-id=917 bgcolor=#d6d6d6
| 546917 ||  || — || January 11, 2010 || Mount Lemmon || Mount Lemmon Survey ||  || align=right | 2.3 km || 
|-id=918 bgcolor=#d6d6d6
| 546918 ||  || — || October 15, 2009 || Mount Lemmon || Mount Lemmon Survey ||  || align=right | 3.8 km || 
|-id=919 bgcolor=#d6d6d6
| 546919 ||  || — || January 8, 2010 || Kitt Peak || Spacewatch ||  || align=right | 3.1 km || 
|-id=920 bgcolor=#d6d6d6
| 546920 ||  || — || December 17, 2009 || Mount Lemmon || Mount Lemmon Survey ||  || align=right | 2.3 km || 
|-id=921 bgcolor=#d6d6d6
| 546921 ||  || — || March 8, 2005 || Kitt Peak || Spacewatch ||  || align=right | 3.4 km || 
|-id=922 bgcolor=#d6d6d6
| 546922 ||  || — || January 12, 2010 || Catalina || CSS ||  || align=right | 2.5 km || 
|-id=923 bgcolor=#fefefe
| 546923 ||  || — || November 21, 2009 || Mount Lemmon || Mount Lemmon Survey || H || align=right data-sort-value="0.59" | 590 m || 
|-id=924 bgcolor=#d6d6d6
| 546924 ||  || — || January 13, 2010 || Kitt Peak || Spacewatch ||  || align=right | 3.1 km || 
|-id=925 bgcolor=#fefefe
| 546925 ||  || — || January 13, 2010 || Mount Lemmon || Mount Lemmon Survey ||  || align=right data-sort-value="0.73" | 730 m || 
|-id=926 bgcolor=#d6d6d6
| 546926 ||  || — || January 13, 2010 || Mount Lemmon || Mount Lemmon Survey ||  || align=right | 2.4 km || 
|-id=927 bgcolor=#fefefe
| 546927 ||  || — || January 13, 2010 || Mount Lemmon || Mount Lemmon Survey ||  || align=right data-sort-value="0.94" | 940 m || 
|-id=928 bgcolor=#fefefe
| 546928 ||  || — || October 14, 2001 || Apache Point || SDSS Collaboration ||  || align=right data-sort-value="0.94" | 940 m || 
|-id=929 bgcolor=#fefefe
| 546929 ||  || — || January 13, 2010 || Mount Lemmon || Mount Lemmon Survey ||  || align=right | 2.0 km || 
|-id=930 bgcolor=#d6d6d6
| 546930 ||  || — || October 24, 2008 || Bergisch Gladbach || W. Bickel ||  || align=right | 3.5 km || 
|-id=931 bgcolor=#fefefe
| 546931 ||  || — || December 16, 2009 || Kitt Peak || Spacewatch ||  || align=right | 1.0 km || 
|-id=932 bgcolor=#fefefe
| 546932 ||  || — || November 12, 2005 || Kitt Peak || Spacewatch ||  || align=right data-sort-value="0.73" | 730 m || 
|-id=933 bgcolor=#fefefe
| 546933 ||  || — || January 6, 2010 || Kitt Peak || Spacewatch ||  || align=right data-sort-value="0.86" | 860 m || 
|-id=934 bgcolor=#d6d6d6
| 546934 ||  || — || January 7, 2010 || Kitt Peak || Spacewatch ||  || align=right | 2.7 km || 
|-id=935 bgcolor=#d6d6d6
| 546935 ||  || — || January 7, 2010 || Kitt Peak || Spacewatch ||  || align=right | 2.4 km || 
|-id=936 bgcolor=#d6d6d6
| 546936 ||  || — || October 26, 2008 || Mount Lemmon || Mount Lemmon Survey ||  || align=right | 3.0 km || 
|-id=937 bgcolor=#d6d6d6
| 546937 ||  || — || January 8, 2010 || Mount Lemmon || Mount Lemmon Survey ||  || align=right | 3.4 km || 
|-id=938 bgcolor=#d6d6d6
| 546938 ||  || — || September 29, 2008 || Mount Lemmon || Mount Lemmon Survey ||  || align=right | 3.0 km || 
|-id=939 bgcolor=#d6d6d6
| 546939 ||  || — || January 13, 2010 || Mount Lemmon || Mount Lemmon Survey ||  || align=right | 2.4 km || 
|-id=940 bgcolor=#fefefe
| 546940 ||  || — || January 24, 2014 || Haleakala || Pan-STARRS ||  || align=right data-sort-value="0.91" | 910 m || 
|-id=941 bgcolor=#d6d6d6
| 546941 ||  || — || December 16, 2014 || Haleakala || Pan-STARRS ||  || align=right | 2.4 km || 
|-id=942 bgcolor=#d6d6d6
| 546942 ||  || — || December 13, 2014 || Haleakala || Pan-STARRS ||  || align=right | 2.9 km || 
|-id=943 bgcolor=#fefefe
| 546943 ||  || — || June 16, 2012 || Haleakala || Pan-STARRS ||  || align=right data-sort-value="0.82" | 820 m || 
|-id=944 bgcolor=#fefefe
| 546944 ||  || — || September 14, 2017 || Haleakala || Pan-STARRS || H || align=right data-sort-value="0.56" | 560 m || 
|-id=945 bgcolor=#d6d6d6
| 546945 ||  || — || December 25, 2009 || Kitt Peak || Spacewatch ||  || align=right | 2.7 km || 
|-id=946 bgcolor=#d6d6d6
| 546946 ||  || — || January 11, 2010 || Kitt Peak || Spacewatch ||  || align=right | 2.2 km || 
|-id=947 bgcolor=#d6d6d6
| 546947 ||  || — || December 2, 2014 || Haleakala || Pan-STARRS ||  || align=right | 2.5 km || 
|-id=948 bgcolor=#d6d6d6
| 546948 ||  || — || August 28, 2013 || Catalina || CSS ||  || align=right | 2.9 km || 
|-id=949 bgcolor=#d6d6d6
| 546949 ||  || — || September 22, 2003 || Palomar || NEAT ||  || align=right | 2.2 km || 
|-id=950 bgcolor=#d6d6d6
| 546950 ||  || — || February 4, 2016 || Haleakala || Pan-STARRS ||  || align=right | 2.9 km || 
|-id=951 bgcolor=#d6d6d6
| 546951 ||  || — || September 3, 2008 || Kitt Peak || Spacewatch ||  || align=right | 2.5 km || 
|-id=952 bgcolor=#d6d6d6
| 546952 ||  || — || March 30, 2016 || Haleakala || Pan-STARRS ||  || align=right | 2.2 km || 
|-id=953 bgcolor=#d6d6d6
| 546953 ||  || — || January 17, 2016 || Haleakala || Pan-STARRS ||  || align=right | 2.7 km || 
|-id=954 bgcolor=#d6d6d6
| 546954 ||  || — || December 1, 2014 || Haleakala || Pan-STARRS ||  || align=right | 2.1 km || 
|-id=955 bgcolor=#d6d6d6
| 546955 ||  || — || November 21, 2009 || Mount Lemmon || Mount Lemmon Survey ||  || align=right | 2.4 km || 
|-id=956 bgcolor=#fefefe
| 546956 ||  || — || December 25, 2009 || Kitt Peak || Spacewatch ||  || align=right data-sort-value="0.87" | 870 m || 
|-id=957 bgcolor=#d6d6d6
| 546957 ||  || — || December 1, 2014 || Haleakala || Pan-STARRS ||  || align=right | 2.4 km || 
|-id=958 bgcolor=#d6d6d6
| 546958 ||  || — || September 3, 2013 || Haleakala || Pan-STARRS ||  || align=right | 1.9 km || 
|-id=959 bgcolor=#fefefe
| 546959 ||  || — || August 26, 2012 || Haleakala || Pan-STARRS ||  || align=right data-sort-value="0.62" | 620 m || 
|-id=960 bgcolor=#d6d6d6
| 546960 ||  || — || January 11, 2010 || Kitt Peak || Spacewatch ||  || align=right | 2.8 km || 
|-id=961 bgcolor=#d6d6d6
| 546961 ||  || — || November 26, 2014 || Haleakala || Pan-STARRS ||  || align=right | 2.8 km || 
|-id=962 bgcolor=#d6d6d6
| 546962 ||  || — || December 10, 2014 || Mount Lemmon || Mount Lemmon Survey ||  || align=right | 2.2 km || 
|-id=963 bgcolor=#d6d6d6
| 546963 ||  || — || January 11, 2010 || Kitt Peak || Spacewatch ||  || align=right | 2.7 km || 
|-id=964 bgcolor=#fefefe
| 546964 ||  || — || January 11, 2010 || Kitt Peak || Spacewatch ||  || align=right data-sort-value="0.64" | 640 m || 
|-id=965 bgcolor=#d6d6d6
| 546965 ||  || — || November 20, 2003 || Kitt Peak || Spacewatch ||  || align=right | 2.8 km || 
|-id=966 bgcolor=#d6d6d6
| 546966 ||  || — || September 5, 2008 || Kitt Peak || Spacewatch ||  || align=right | 3.1 km || 
|-id=967 bgcolor=#fefefe
| 546967 ||  || — || December 20, 2009 || Kitt Peak || Spacewatch ||  || align=right data-sort-value="0.79" | 790 m || 
|-id=968 bgcolor=#d6d6d6
| 546968 ||  || — || January 18, 2010 || Dauban || C. Rinner, F. Kugel ||  || align=right | 2.0 km || 
|-id=969 bgcolor=#d6d6d6
| 546969 ||  || — || September 12, 2002 || Palomar || NEAT ||  || align=right | 2.9 km || 
|-id=970 bgcolor=#fefefe
| 546970 ||  || — || January 18, 2010 || Dauban || C. Rinner, F. Kugel || NYS || align=right data-sort-value="0.60" | 600 m || 
|-id=971 bgcolor=#d6d6d6
| 546971 ||  || — || December 18, 2009 || Mount Lemmon || Mount Lemmon Survey ||  || align=right | 2.6 km || 
|-id=972 bgcolor=#d6d6d6
| 546972 ||  || — || January 5, 2010 || Kitt Peak || Spacewatch || EOS || align=right | 2.3 km || 
|-id=973 bgcolor=#d6d6d6
| 546973 ||  || — || December 15, 2009 || Mount Lemmon || Mount Lemmon Survey ||  || align=right | 3.0 km || 
|-id=974 bgcolor=#C2E0FF
| 546974 ||  || — || January 23, 2010 || Haleakala || Pan-STARRS || SDO || align=right | 243 km || 
|-id=975 bgcolor=#d6d6d6
| 546975 ||  || — || December 18, 2009 || Mount Lemmon || Mount Lemmon Survey || Tj (2.99) || align=right | 3.7 km || 
|-id=976 bgcolor=#fefefe
| 546976 ||  || — || February 12, 2010 || Pla D'Arguines || R. Ferrando, M. Ferrando || H || align=right data-sort-value="0.68" | 680 m || 
|-id=977 bgcolor=#d6d6d6
| 546977 ||  || — || February 8, 2010 || Kitt Peak || Spacewatch ||  || align=right | 3.0 km || 
|-id=978 bgcolor=#d6d6d6
| 546978 ||  || — || December 25, 2009 || Kitt Peak || Spacewatch ||  || align=right | 2.4 km || 
|-id=979 bgcolor=#d6d6d6
| 546979 ||  || — || January 6, 2010 || Kitt Peak || Spacewatch ||  || align=right | 2.7 km || 
|-id=980 bgcolor=#fefefe
| 546980 ||  || — || September 11, 2001 || Anderson Mesa || LONEOS ||  || align=right data-sort-value="0.71" | 710 m || 
|-id=981 bgcolor=#d6d6d6
| 546981 ||  || — || January 6, 2010 || Kitt Peak || Spacewatch ||  || align=right | 2.9 km || 
|-id=982 bgcolor=#d6d6d6
| 546982 ||  || — || February 9, 2010 || Kitt Peak || Spacewatch ||  || align=right | 2.9 km || 
|-id=983 bgcolor=#d6d6d6
| 546983 ||  || — || January 10, 2010 || Kitt Peak || Spacewatch ||  || align=right | 2.6 km || 
|-id=984 bgcolor=#d6d6d6
| 546984 ||  || — || October 31, 2008 || Mount Lemmon || Mount Lemmon Survey ||  || align=right | 2.7 km || 
|-id=985 bgcolor=#fefefe
| 546985 ||  || — || July 30, 2000 || Cerro Tololo || M. W. Buie, S. D. Kern ||  || align=right data-sort-value="0.79" | 790 m || 
|-id=986 bgcolor=#d6d6d6
| 546986 ||  || — || August 5, 2007 || 7300 || W. K. Y. Yeung ||  || align=right | 2.8 km || 
|-id=987 bgcolor=#d6d6d6
| 546987 ||  || — || February 9, 2010 || Mount Lemmon || Mount Lemmon Survey ||  || align=right | 2.0 km || 
|-id=988 bgcolor=#fefefe
| 546988 ||  || — || February 9, 2010 || Mount Lemmon || Mount Lemmon Survey ||  || align=right data-sort-value="0.64" | 640 m || 
|-id=989 bgcolor=#fefefe
| 546989 ||  || — || April 8, 2003 || Kitt Peak || Spacewatch ||  || align=right data-sort-value="0.78" | 780 m || 
|-id=990 bgcolor=#d6d6d6
| 546990 ||  || — || March 9, 2005 || Mount Lemmon || Mount Lemmon Survey ||  || align=right | 2.0 km || 
|-id=991 bgcolor=#d6d6d6
| 546991 ||  || — || February 9, 2010 || Mount Lemmon || Mount Lemmon Survey ||  || align=right | 2.4 km || 
|-id=992 bgcolor=#d6d6d6
| 546992 ||  || — || January 7, 2010 || Kitt Peak || Spacewatch ||  || align=right | 2.4 km || 
|-id=993 bgcolor=#d6d6d6
| 546993 ||  || — || February 9, 2010 || Mount Lemmon || Mount Lemmon Survey ||  || align=right | 3.1 km || 
|-id=994 bgcolor=#fefefe
| 546994 ||  || — || February 9, 2010 || Mount Lemmon || Mount Lemmon Survey ||  || align=right data-sort-value="0.78" | 780 m || 
|-id=995 bgcolor=#d6d6d6
| 546995 ||  || — || March 10, 2005 || Mount Lemmon || Mount Lemmon Survey ||  || align=right | 2.2 km || 
|-id=996 bgcolor=#d6d6d6
| 546996 ||  || — || November 18, 2008 || Kitt Peak || Spacewatch ||  || align=right | 3.1 km || 
|-id=997 bgcolor=#d6d6d6
| 546997 ||  || — || February 10, 2010 || Kitt Peak || Spacewatch ||  || align=right | 2.7 km || 
|-id=998 bgcolor=#d6d6d6
| 546998 ||  || — || April 6, 2005 || Mount Lemmon || Mount Lemmon Survey ||  || align=right | 2.4 km || 
|-id=999 bgcolor=#d6d6d6
| 546999 ||  || — || February 10, 2010 || Kitt Peak || Spacewatch ||  || align=right | 2.9 km || 
|-id=000 bgcolor=#fefefe
| 547000 ||  || — || February 10, 2010 || Kitt Peak || Spacewatch ||  || align=right data-sort-value="0.78" | 780 m || 
|}

References

External links 
 Discovery Circumstances: Numbered Minor Planets (545001)–(550000) (IAU Minor Planet Center)

0546